

475001–475100 

|-bgcolor=#d6d6d6
| 475001 ||  || — || October 7, 2005 || Kitt Peak || Spacewatch || — || align=right | 2.5 km || 
|-id=002 bgcolor=#d6d6d6
| 475002 ||  || — || September 25, 2005 || Kitt Peak || Spacewatch || — || align=right | 2.3 km || 
|-id=003 bgcolor=#d6d6d6
| 475003 ||  || — || October 9, 2005 || Kitt Peak || Spacewatch || — || align=right | 3.2 km || 
|-id=004 bgcolor=#d6d6d6
| 475004 ||  || — || September 23, 2005 || Kitt Peak || Spacewatch || — || align=right | 2.6 km || 
|-id=005 bgcolor=#d6d6d6
| 475005 ||  || — || September 26, 2005 || Kitt Peak || Spacewatch || — || align=right | 2.2 km || 
|-id=006 bgcolor=#d6d6d6
| 475006 ||  || — || September 23, 2005 || Kitt Peak || Spacewatch || — || align=right | 2.1 km || 
|-id=007 bgcolor=#d6d6d6
| 475007 ||  || — || October 9, 2005 || Kitt Peak || Spacewatch || — || align=right | 2.5 km || 
|-id=008 bgcolor=#d6d6d6
| 475008 ||  || — || October 9, 2005 || Kitt Peak || Spacewatch || VER || align=right | 2.2 km || 
|-id=009 bgcolor=#d6d6d6
| 475009 ||  || — || October 9, 2005 || Kitt Peak || Spacewatch || — || align=right | 2.3 km || 
|-id=010 bgcolor=#fefefe
| 475010 ||  || — || October 9, 2005 || Kitt Peak || Spacewatch || NYS || align=right data-sort-value="0.59" | 590 m || 
|-id=011 bgcolor=#fefefe
| 475011 ||  || — || October 1, 2005 || Kitt Peak || Spacewatch || — || align=right data-sort-value="0.64" | 640 m || 
|-id=012 bgcolor=#d6d6d6
| 475012 ||  || — || October 1, 2005 || Mount Lemmon || Mount Lemmon Survey || Tj (2.95) || align=right | 2.5 km || 
|-id=013 bgcolor=#d6d6d6
| 475013 ||  || — || October 1, 2005 || Mount Lemmon || Mount Lemmon Survey || — || align=right | 2.4 km || 
|-id=014 bgcolor=#fefefe
| 475014 ||  || — || October 1, 2005 || Mount Lemmon || Mount Lemmon Survey || — || align=right data-sort-value="0.67" | 670 m || 
|-id=015 bgcolor=#d6d6d6
| 475015 ||  || — || October 1, 2005 || Mount Lemmon || Mount Lemmon Survey || THM || align=right | 2.1 km || 
|-id=016 bgcolor=#FFC2E0
| 475016 ||  || — || October 23, 2005 || Catalina || CSS || APOcritical || align=right data-sort-value="0.16" | 160 m || 
|-id=017 bgcolor=#d6d6d6
| 475017 ||  || — || October 26, 2005 || Ottmarsheim || C. Rinner || — || align=right | 4.7 km || 
|-id=018 bgcolor=#d6d6d6
| 475018 ||  || — || October 20, 2005 || Palomar || NEAT || Tj (2.97) || align=right | 4.8 km || 
|-id=019 bgcolor=#fefefe
| 475019 ||  || — || October 21, 2005 || Palomar || NEAT || — || align=right | 1.8 km || 
|-id=020 bgcolor=#fefefe
| 475020 ||  || — || October 21, 2005 || Palomar || NEAT || — || align=right data-sort-value="0.72" | 720 m || 
|-id=021 bgcolor=#d6d6d6
| 475021 ||  || — || October 22, 2005 || Kitt Peak || Spacewatch || — || align=right | 3.0 km || 
|-id=022 bgcolor=#fefefe
| 475022 ||  || — || October 22, 2005 || Kitt Peak || Spacewatch || — || align=right data-sort-value="0.79" | 790 m || 
|-id=023 bgcolor=#fefefe
| 475023 ||  || — || October 22, 2005 || Catalina || CSS || NYS || align=right data-sort-value="0.52" | 520 m || 
|-id=024 bgcolor=#d6d6d6
| 475024 ||  || — || October 23, 2005 || Kitt Peak || Spacewatch || — || align=right | 2.5 km || 
|-id=025 bgcolor=#d6d6d6
| 475025 ||  || — || October 23, 2005 || Kitt Peak || Spacewatch || — || align=right | 2.7 km || 
|-id=026 bgcolor=#d6d6d6
| 475026 ||  || — || September 30, 2005 || Mount Lemmon || Mount Lemmon Survey || — || align=right | 2.1 km || 
|-id=027 bgcolor=#fefefe
| 475027 ||  || — || October 23, 2005 || Kitt Peak || Spacewatch || — || align=right | 1.9 km || 
|-id=028 bgcolor=#fefefe
| 475028 ||  || — || September 30, 2005 || Mount Lemmon || Mount Lemmon Survey || MAS || align=right data-sort-value="0.69" | 690 m || 
|-id=029 bgcolor=#d6d6d6
| 475029 ||  || — || October 23, 2005 || Catalina || CSS || — || align=right | 2.9 km || 
|-id=030 bgcolor=#fefefe
| 475030 ||  || — || October 12, 2005 || Kitt Peak || Spacewatch || — || align=right data-sort-value="0.83" | 830 m || 
|-id=031 bgcolor=#d6d6d6
| 475031 ||  || — || October 23, 2005 || Kitt Peak || Spacewatch || THM || align=right | 2.1 km || 
|-id=032 bgcolor=#d6d6d6
| 475032 ||  || — || October 24, 2005 || Kitt Peak || Spacewatch || — || align=right | 2.2 km || 
|-id=033 bgcolor=#fefefe
| 475033 ||  || — || October 24, 2005 || Kitt Peak || Spacewatch || — || align=right data-sort-value="0.79" | 790 m || 
|-id=034 bgcolor=#fefefe
| 475034 ||  || — || October 24, 2005 || Kitt Peak || Spacewatch || — || align=right data-sort-value="0.59" | 590 m || 
|-id=035 bgcolor=#d6d6d6
| 475035 ||  || — || October 24, 2005 || Kitt Peak || Spacewatch || — || align=right | 2.7 km || 
|-id=036 bgcolor=#fefefe
| 475036 ||  || — || October 22, 2005 || Catalina || CSS || NYS || align=right data-sort-value="0.67" | 670 m || 
|-id=037 bgcolor=#fefefe
| 475037 ||  || — || October 22, 2005 || Catalina || CSS || — || align=right data-sort-value="0.79" | 790 m || 
|-id=038 bgcolor=#fefefe
| 475038 ||  || — || October 24, 2005 || Kitt Peak || Spacewatch || NYS || align=right data-sort-value="0.58" | 580 m || 
|-id=039 bgcolor=#d6d6d6
| 475039 ||  || — || October 24, 2005 || Kitt Peak || Spacewatch || — || align=right | 2.5 km || 
|-id=040 bgcolor=#fefefe
| 475040 ||  || — || October 25, 2005 || Kitt Peak || Spacewatch || MAS || align=right data-sort-value="0.73" | 730 m || 
|-id=041 bgcolor=#fefefe
| 475041 ||  || — || September 30, 2005 || Mount Lemmon || Mount Lemmon Survey || MAS || align=right data-sort-value="0.63" | 630 m || 
|-id=042 bgcolor=#fefefe
| 475042 ||  || — || October 25, 2005 || Mount Lemmon || Mount Lemmon Survey || — || align=right data-sort-value="0.65" | 650 m || 
|-id=043 bgcolor=#fefefe
| 475043 ||  || — || October 1, 2005 || Mount Lemmon || Mount Lemmon Survey || MAS || align=right data-sort-value="0.78" | 780 m || 
|-id=044 bgcolor=#d6d6d6
| 475044 ||  || — || October 10, 2005 || Catalina || CSS || — || align=right | 2.4 km || 
|-id=045 bgcolor=#fefefe
| 475045 ||  || — || September 29, 2005 || Catalina || CSS || — || align=right | 1.1 km || 
|-id=046 bgcolor=#d6d6d6
| 475046 ||  || — || October 23, 2005 || Catalina || CSS || — || align=right | 2.8 km || 
|-id=047 bgcolor=#d6d6d6
| 475047 ||  || — || October 22, 2005 || Kitt Peak || Spacewatch || THM || align=right | 1.9 km || 
|-id=048 bgcolor=#d6d6d6
| 475048 ||  || — || October 1, 2005 || Mount Lemmon || Mount Lemmon Survey || THM || align=right | 2.4 km || 
|-id=049 bgcolor=#d6d6d6
| 475049 ||  || — || September 5, 1999 || Kitt Peak || Spacewatch || HYG || align=right | 2.2 km || 
|-id=050 bgcolor=#d6d6d6
| 475050 ||  || — || October 22, 2005 || Kitt Peak || Spacewatch || — || align=right | 2.5 km || 
|-id=051 bgcolor=#fefefe
| 475051 ||  || — || October 22, 2005 || Kitt Peak || Spacewatch || — || align=right data-sort-value="0.68" | 680 m || 
|-id=052 bgcolor=#d6d6d6
| 475052 ||  || — || October 22, 2005 || Kitt Peak || Spacewatch || — || align=right | 2.9 km || 
|-id=053 bgcolor=#d6d6d6
| 475053 ||  || — || October 22, 2005 || Kitt Peak || Spacewatch || — || align=right | 2.6 km || 
|-id=054 bgcolor=#fefefe
| 475054 ||  || — || October 22, 2005 || Kitt Peak || Spacewatch || NYS || align=right data-sort-value="0.54" | 540 m || 
|-id=055 bgcolor=#d6d6d6
| 475055 ||  || — || October 22, 2005 || Kitt Peak || Spacewatch || — || align=right | 2.5 km || 
|-id=056 bgcolor=#d6d6d6
| 475056 ||  || — || October 22, 2005 || Kitt Peak || Spacewatch || HYG || align=right | 2.4 km || 
|-id=057 bgcolor=#d6d6d6
| 475057 ||  || — || October 22, 2005 || Kitt Peak || Spacewatch || — || align=right | 2.2 km || 
|-id=058 bgcolor=#fefefe
| 475058 ||  || — || October 22, 2005 || Kitt Peak || Spacewatch || — || align=right data-sort-value="0.67" | 670 m || 
|-id=059 bgcolor=#d6d6d6
| 475059 ||  || — || October 23, 2005 || Catalina || CSS || — || align=right | 3.3 km || 
|-id=060 bgcolor=#d6d6d6
| 475060 ||  || — || October 7, 2005 || Mount Lemmon || Mount Lemmon Survey || — || align=right | 3.8 km || 
|-id=061 bgcolor=#fefefe
| 475061 ||  || — || September 30, 2005 || Mount Lemmon || Mount Lemmon Survey || — || align=right data-sort-value="0.78" | 780 m || 
|-id=062 bgcolor=#d6d6d6
| 475062 ||  || — || September 30, 2005 || Mount Lemmon || Mount Lemmon Survey || — || align=right | 2.4 km || 
|-id=063 bgcolor=#d6d6d6
| 475063 ||  || — || October 1, 2005 || Mount Lemmon || Mount Lemmon Survey || THM || align=right | 2.1 km || 
|-id=064 bgcolor=#fefefe
| 475064 ||  || — || October 24, 2005 || Kitt Peak || Spacewatch || NYS || align=right data-sort-value="0.50" | 500 m || 
|-id=065 bgcolor=#fefefe
| 475065 ||  || — || October 24, 2005 || Kitt Peak || Spacewatch || — || align=right data-sort-value="0.71" | 710 m || 
|-id=066 bgcolor=#fefefe
| 475066 ||  || — || October 24, 2005 || Kitt Peak || Spacewatch || NYS || align=right data-sort-value="0.54" | 540 m || 
|-id=067 bgcolor=#d6d6d6
| 475067 ||  || — || October 24, 2005 || Kitt Peak || Spacewatch || — || align=right | 2.6 km || 
|-id=068 bgcolor=#d6d6d6
| 475068 ||  || — || September 25, 2005 || Kitt Peak || Spacewatch || — || align=right | 2.5 km || 
|-id=069 bgcolor=#d6d6d6
| 475069 ||  || — || October 25, 2005 || Mount Lemmon || Mount Lemmon Survey || EOS || align=right | 1.9 km || 
|-id=070 bgcolor=#fefefe
| 475070 ||  || — || October 25, 2005 || Mount Lemmon || Mount Lemmon Survey || MAS || align=right data-sort-value="0.58" | 580 m || 
|-id=071 bgcolor=#fefefe
| 475071 ||  || — || October 25, 2005 || Mount Lemmon || Mount Lemmon Survey || MAS || align=right data-sort-value="0.58" | 580 m || 
|-id=072 bgcolor=#d6d6d6
| 475072 ||  || — || October 12, 2005 || Kitt Peak || Spacewatch || — || align=right | 2.2 km || 
|-id=073 bgcolor=#d6d6d6
| 475073 ||  || — || October 25, 2005 || Mount Lemmon || Mount Lemmon Survey || — || align=right | 2.9 km || 
|-id=074 bgcolor=#d6d6d6
| 475074 ||  || — || October 25, 2005 || Mount Lemmon || Mount Lemmon Survey || — || align=right | 2.6 km || 
|-id=075 bgcolor=#fefefe
| 475075 ||  || — || October 26, 2005 || Kitt Peak || Spacewatch || — || align=right data-sort-value="0.76" | 760 m || 
|-id=076 bgcolor=#d6d6d6
| 475076 ||  || — || October 26, 2005 || Kitt Peak || Spacewatch || — || align=right | 2.7 km || 
|-id=077 bgcolor=#d6d6d6
| 475077 ||  || — || October 26, 2005 || Palomar || NEAT || — || align=right | 2.4 km || 
|-id=078 bgcolor=#d6d6d6
| 475078 ||  || — || October 25, 2005 || Mount Lemmon || Mount Lemmon Survey || fast? || align=right | 2.7 km || 
|-id=079 bgcolor=#fefefe
| 475079 ||  || — || October 28, 2005 || Catalina || CSS || H || align=right data-sort-value="0.80" | 800 m || 
|-id=080 bgcolor=#fefefe
| 475080 Jarry ||  ||  || October 26, 2005 || Nogales || J.-C. Merlin || — || align=right data-sort-value="0.69" | 690 m || 
|-id=081 bgcolor=#fefefe
| 475081 ||  || — || October 24, 2005 || Kitt Peak || Spacewatch || — || align=right data-sort-value="0.81" | 810 m || 
|-id=082 bgcolor=#d6d6d6
| 475082 ||  || — || October 24, 2005 || Kitt Peak || Spacewatch || — || align=right | 3.4 km || 
|-id=083 bgcolor=#d6d6d6
| 475083 ||  || — || October 24, 2005 || Kitt Peak || Spacewatch || — || align=right | 3.0 km || 
|-id=084 bgcolor=#fefefe
| 475084 ||  || — || October 24, 2005 || Kitt Peak || Spacewatch || NYS || align=right data-sort-value="0.52" | 520 m || 
|-id=085 bgcolor=#d6d6d6
| 475085 ||  || — || October 25, 2005 || Mount Lemmon || Mount Lemmon Survey || Tj (2.99) || align=right | 3.2 km || 
|-id=086 bgcolor=#d6d6d6
| 475086 ||  || — || September 30, 2005 || Mount Lemmon || Mount Lemmon Survey || — || align=right | 2.4 km || 
|-id=087 bgcolor=#fefefe
| 475087 ||  || — || October 26, 2005 || Kitt Peak || Spacewatch || V || align=right data-sort-value="0.55" | 550 m || 
|-id=088 bgcolor=#d6d6d6
| 475088 ||  || — || October 27, 2005 || Mount Lemmon || Mount Lemmon Survey || — || align=right | 2.7 km || 
|-id=089 bgcolor=#d6d6d6
| 475089 ||  || — || October 27, 2005 || Mount Lemmon || Mount Lemmon Survey || — || align=right | 3.0 km || 
|-id=090 bgcolor=#fefefe
| 475090 ||  || — || October 27, 2005 || Mount Lemmon || Mount Lemmon Survey || critical || align=right data-sort-value="0.65" | 650 m || 
|-id=091 bgcolor=#fefefe
| 475091 ||  || — || October 5, 2005 || Kitt Peak || Spacewatch || V || align=right data-sort-value="0.51" | 510 m || 
|-id=092 bgcolor=#d6d6d6
| 475092 ||  || — || October 22, 2005 || Kitt Peak || Spacewatch || — || align=right | 3.3 km || 
|-id=093 bgcolor=#d6d6d6
| 475093 ||  || — || October 24, 2005 || Kitt Peak || Spacewatch || THM || align=right | 2.1 km || 
|-id=094 bgcolor=#fefefe
| 475094 ||  || — || October 25, 2005 || Kitt Peak || Spacewatch || NYS || align=right data-sort-value="0.60" | 600 m || 
|-id=095 bgcolor=#fefefe
| 475095 ||  || — || October 25, 2005 || Kitt Peak || Spacewatch || — || align=right data-sort-value="0.71" | 710 m || 
|-id=096 bgcolor=#d6d6d6
| 475096 ||  || — || October 25, 2005 || Kitt Peak || Spacewatch || — || align=right | 3.2 km || 
|-id=097 bgcolor=#fefefe
| 475097 ||  || — || October 23, 2005 || Kitt Peak || Spacewatch || H || align=right data-sort-value="0.54" | 540 m || 
|-id=098 bgcolor=#fefefe
| 475098 ||  || — || October 25, 2005 || Kitt Peak || Spacewatch || V || align=right data-sort-value="0.54" | 540 m || 
|-id=099 bgcolor=#d6d6d6
| 475099 ||  || — || October 25, 2005 || Kitt Peak || Spacewatch || — || align=right | 3.0 km || 
|-id=100 bgcolor=#fefefe
| 475100 ||  || — || October 25, 2005 || Kitt Peak || Spacewatch || NYS || align=right data-sort-value="0.57" | 570 m || 
|}

475101–475200 

|-bgcolor=#d6d6d6
| 475101 ||  || — || October 25, 2005 || Kitt Peak || Spacewatch || — || align=right | 3.2 km || 
|-id=102 bgcolor=#fefefe
| 475102 ||  || — || October 25, 2005 || Kitt Peak || Spacewatch || MAS || align=right data-sort-value="0.71" | 710 m || 
|-id=103 bgcolor=#fefefe
| 475103 ||  || — || October 25, 2005 || Mount Lemmon || Mount Lemmon Survey || NYS || align=right data-sort-value="0.65" | 650 m || 
|-id=104 bgcolor=#d6d6d6
| 475104 ||  || — || October 25, 2005 || Kitt Peak || Spacewatch || — || align=right | 3.2 km || 
|-id=105 bgcolor=#fefefe
| 475105 ||  || — || October 25, 2005 || Kitt Peak || Spacewatch || — || align=right data-sort-value="0.70" | 700 m || 
|-id=106 bgcolor=#fefefe
| 475106 ||  || — || October 25, 2005 || Kitt Peak || Spacewatch || — || align=right data-sort-value="0.68" | 680 m || 
|-id=107 bgcolor=#d6d6d6
| 475107 ||  || — || October 25, 2005 || Kitt Peak || Spacewatch || — || align=right | 2.7 km || 
|-id=108 bgcolor=#d6d6d6
| 475108 ||  || — || October 25, 2005 || Kitt Peak || Spacewatch || — || align=right | 2.5 km || 
|-id=109 bgcolor=#d6d6d6
| 475109 ||  || — || October 25, 2005 || Catalina || CSS || — || align=right | 3.2 km || 
|-id=110 bgcolor=#d6d6d6
| 475110 ||  || — || October 26, 2005 || Kitt Peak || Spacewatch || — || align=right | 2.3 km || 
|-id=111 bgcolor=#d6d6d6
| 475111 ||  || — || October 25, 2005 || Kitt Peak || Spacewatch || — || align=right | 4.3 km || 
|-id=112 bgcolor=#fefefe
| 475112 ||  || — || October 25, 2005 || Kitt Peak || Spacewatch || — || align=right data-sort-value="0.83" | 830 m || 
|-id=113 bgcolor=#fefefe
| 475113 ||  || — || October 26, 2005 || Kitt Peak || Spacewatch || MAS || align=right data-sort-value="0.64" | 640 m || 
|-id=114 bgcolor=#fefefe
| 475114 ||  || — || October 27, 2005 || Kitt Peak || Spacewatch || MAS || align=right data-sort-value="0.53" | 530 m || 
|-id=115 bgcolor=#d6d6d6
| 475115 ||  || — || September 29, 2005 || Mount Lemmon || Mount Lemmon Survey || — || align=right | 2.5 km || 
|-id=116 bgcolor=#d6d6d6
| 475116 ||  || — || October 28, 2005 || Mount Lemmon || Mount Lemmon Survey || — || align=right | 2.4 km || 
|-id=117 bgcolor=#d6d6d6
| 475117 ||  || — || October 25, 2005 || Catalina || CSS || — || align=right | 3.5 km || 
|-id=118 bgcolor=#d6d6d6
| 475118 ||  || — || October 29, 2005 || Catalina || CSS || — || align=right | 3.5 km || 
|-id=119 bgcolor=#d6d6d6
| 475119 ||  || — || October 24, 2005 || Kitt Peak || Spacewatch || — || align=right | 3.2 km || 
|-id=120 bgcolor=#d6d6d6
| 475120 ||  || — || October 24, 2005 || Kitt Peak || Spacewatch || — || align=right | 2.5 km || 
|-id=121 bgcolor=#d6d6d6
| 475121 ||  || — || October 26, 2005 || Kitt Peak || Spacewatch || — || align=right | 3.1 km || 
|-id=122 bgcolor=#d6d6d6
| 475122 ||  || — || September 25, 2005 || Kitt Peak || Spacewatch || — || align=right | 2.7 km || 
|-id=123 bgcolor=#d6d6d6
| 475123 ||  || — || October 26, 2005 || Kitt Peak || Spacewatch || VER || align=right | 2.7 km || 
|-id=124 bgcolor=#d6d6d6
| 475124 ||  || — || October 26, 2005 || Kitt Peak || Spacewatch || — || align=right | 2.6 km || 
|-id=125 bgcolor=#d6d6d6
| 475125 ||  || — || October 26, 2005 || Kitt Peak || Spacewatch || — || align=right | 2.7 km || 
|-id=126 bgcolor=#d6d6d6
| 475126 ||  || — || October 26, 2005 || Kitt Peak || Spacewatch || THM || align=right | 1.9 km || 
|-id=127 bgcolor=#fefefe
| 475127 ||  || — || October 26, 2005 || Kitt Peak || Spacewatch || — || align=right data-sort-value="0.95" | 950 m || 
|-id=128 bgcolor=#d6d6d6
| 475128 ||  || — || October 27, 2005 || Mount Lemmon || Mount Lemmon Survey || — || align=right | 2.7 km || 
|-id=129 bgcolor=#fefefe
| 475129 ||  || — || October 27, 2005 || Mount Lemmon || Mount Lemmon Survey || MAS || align=right data-sort-value="0.64" | 640 m || 
|-id=130 bgcolor=#d6d6d6
| 475130 ||  || — || October 29, 2005 || Catalina || CSS || — || align=right | 3.7 km || 
|-id=131 bgcolor=#fefefe
| 475131 ||  || — || October 7, 2005 || Mount Lemmon || Mount Lemmon Survey || — || align=right data-sort-value="0.71" | 710 m || 
|-id=132 bgcolor=#d6d6d6
| 475132 ||  || — || October 27, 2005 || Kitt Peak || Spacewatch || — || align=right | 3.4 km || 
|-id=133 bgcolor=#fefefe
| 475133 ||  || — || October 1, 2005 || Mount Lemmon || Mount Lemmon Survey || — || align=right data-sort-value="0.63" | 630 m || 
|-id=134 bgcolor=#FA8072
| 475134 ||  || — || October 29, 2005 || Kitt Peak || Spacewatch || — || align=right data-sort-value="0.91" | 910 m || 
|-id=135 bgcolor=#fefefe
| 475135 ||  || — || October 30, 2005 || Kitt Peak || Spacewatch || — || align=right data-sort-value="0.74" | 740 m || 
|-id=136 bgcolor=#d6d6d6
| 475136 ||  || — || September 30, 2005 || Mount Lemmon || Mount Lemmon Survey || — || align=right | 2.2 km || 
|-id=137 bgcolor=#d6d6d6
| 475137 ||  || — || October 31, 2005 || Mount Lemmon || Mount Lemmon Survey || ELF || align=right | 4.2 km || 
|-id=138 bgcolor=#fefefe
| 475138 ||  || — || October 31, 2005 || Mount Lemmon || Mount Lemmon Survey || V || align=right data-sort-value="0.50" | 500 m || 
|-id=139 bgcolor=#d6d6d6
| 475139 ||  || — || October 29, 2005 || Mount Lemmon || Mount Lemmon Survey || — || align=right | 2.9 km || 
|-id=140 bgcolor=#d6d6d6
| 475140 ||  || — || October 31, 2005 || Kitt Peak || Spacewatch || — || align=right | 3.1 km || 
|-id=141 bgcolor=#d6d6d6
| 475141 ||  || — || October 23, 2005 || Catalina || CSS || LIX || align=right | 2.9 km || 
|-id=142 bgcolor=#d6d6d6
| 475142 ||  || — || October 25, 2005 || Catalina || CSS || — || align=right | 3.8 km || 
|-id=143 bgcolor=#d6d6d6
| 475143 ||  || — || October 29, 2005 || Catalina || CSS || LIX || align=right | 4.0 km || 
|-id=144 bgcolor=#fefefe
| 475144 ||  || — || October 29, 2005 || Catalina || CSS || — || align=right data-sort-value="0.81" | 810 m || 
|-id=145 bgcolor=#d6d6d6
| 475145 ||  || — || October 29, 2005 || Catalina || CSS || Tj (2.98) || align=right | 4.2 km || 
|-id=146 bgcolor=#d6d6d6
| 475146 ||  || — || October 24, 2005 || Kitt Peak || Spacewatch || EOS || align=right | 1.5 km || 
|-id=147 bgcolor=#fefefe
| 475147 ||  || — || October 7, 2005 || Kitt Peak || Spacewatch || — || align=right data-sort-value="0.65" | 650 m || 
|-id=148 bgcolor=#fefefe
| 475148 ||  || — || October 27, 2005 || Kitt Peak || Spacewatch || — || align=right data-sort-value="0.75" | 750 m || 
|-id=149 bgcolor=#fefefe
| 475149 ||  || — || October 27, 2005 || Kitt Peak || Spacewatch || NYS || align=right data-sort-value="0.53" | 530 m || 
|-id=150 bgcolor=#d6d6d6
| 475150 ||  || — || October 22, 2005 || Kitt Peak || Spacewatch || — || align=right | 2.9 km || 
|-id=151 bgcolor=#d6d6d6
| 475151 ||  || — || October 22, 2005 || Kitt Peak || Spacewatch || — || align=right | 2.7 km || 
|-id=152 bgcolor=#d6d6d6
| 475152 ||  || — || October 27, 2005 || Kitt Peak || Spacewatch || — || align=right | 3.7 km || 
|-id=153 bgcolor=#fefefe
| 475153 ||  || — || October 29, 2005 || Mount Lemmon || Mount Lemmon Survey || MAS || align=right data-sort-value="0.72" | 720 m || 
|-id=154 bgcolor=#d6d6d6
| 475154 ||  || — || October 29, 2005 || Mount Lemmon || Mount Lemmon Survey || — || align=right | 3.0 km || 
|-id=155 bgcolor=#d6d6d6
| 475155 ||  || — || October 30, 2005 || Mount Lemmon || Mount Lemmon Survey || — || align=right | 3.1 km || 
|-id=156 bgcolor=#d6d6d6
| 475156 ||  || — || October 1, 2005 || Mount Lemmon || Mount Lemmon Survey || — || align=right | 3.4 km || 
|-id=157 bgcolor=#fefefe
| 475157 ||  || — || October 11, 2005 || Kitt Peak || Spacewatch || — || align=right data-sort-value="0.61" | 610 m || 
|-id=158 bgcolor=#d6d6d6
| 475158 ||  || — || October 30, 2005 || Catalina || CSS || — || align=right | 3.9 km || 
|-id=159 bgcolor=#d6d6d6
| 475159 ||  || — || October 27, 2005 || Anderson Mesa || LONEOS || — || align=right | 3.2 km || 
|-id=160 bgcolor=#fefefe
| 475160 ||  || — || October 29, 2005 || Mount Lemmon || Mount Lemmon Survey || MAS || align=right data-sort-value="0.68" | 680 m || 
|-id=161 bgcolor=#d6d6d6
| 475161 ||  || — || October 6, 2005 || Kitt Peak || Spacewatch || — || align=right | 2.6 km || 
|-id=162 bgcolor=#d6d6d6
| 475162 ||  || — || October 31, 2005 || Kitt Peak || Spacewatch || — || align=right | 3.2 km || 
|-id=163 bgcolor=#d6d6d6
| 475163 ||  || — || October 31, 2005 || Mount Lemmon || Mount Lemmon Survey || — || align=right | 2.6 km || 
|-id=164 bgcolor=#d6d6d6
| 475164 ||  || — || October 25, 2005 || Kitt Peak || Spacewatch || EOS || align=right | 1.9 km || 
|-id=165 bgcolor=#d6d6d6
| 475165 ||  || — || October 12, 2005 || Kitt Peak || Spacewatch || — || align=right | 2.4 km || 
|-id=166 bgcolor=#d6d6d6
| 475166 ||  || — || October 28, 2005 || Mount Lemmon || Mount Lemmon Survey || THM || align=right | 2.1 km || 
|-id=167 bgcolor=#fefefe
| 475167 ||  || — || October 28, 2005 || Kitt Peak || Spacewatch || — || align=right data-sort-value="0.57" | 570 m || 
|-id=168 bgcolor=#d6d6d6
| 475168 ||  || — || October 29, 2005 || Mount Lemmon || Mount Lemmon Survey || — || align=right | 2.6 km || 
|-id=169 bgcolor=#fefefe
| 475169 ||  || — || October 29, 2005 || Catalina || CSS || — || align=right data-sort-value="0.77" | 770 m || 
|-id=170 bgcolor=#d6d6d6
| 475170 ||  || — || October 31, 2005 || Kitt Peak || Spacewatch || — || align=right | 2.6 km || 
|-id=171 bgcolor=#fefefe
| 475171 ||  || — || October 1, 2005 || Catalina || CSS || — || align=right data-sort-value="0.76" | 760 m || 
|-id=172 bgcolor=#d6d6d6
| 475172 ||  || — || October 31, 2005 || Socorro || LINEAR || (1298) || align=right | 3.3 km || 
|-id=173 bgcolor=#d6d6d6
| 475173 ||  || — || October 25, 2005 || Catalina || CSS || TIR || align=right | 3.4 km || 
|-id=174 bgcolor=#fefefe
| 475174 ||  || — || September 30, 2005 || Mount Lemmon || Mount Lemmon Survey || — || align=right data-sort-value="0.75" | 750 m || 
|-id=175 bgcolor=#d6d6d6
| 475175 ||  || — || September 30, 2005 || Mount Lemmon || Mount Lemmon Survey || — || align=right | 2.6 km || 
|-id=176 bgcolor=#fefefe
| 475176 ||  || — || October 30, 2005 || Kitt Peak || Spacewatch || — || align=right data-sort-value="0.66" | 660 m || 
|-id=177 bgcolor=#d6d6d6
| 475177 ||  || — || October 30, 2005 || Kitt Peak || Spacewatch || HYG || align=right | 2.7 km || 
|-id=178 bgcolor=#fefefe
| 475178 ||  || — || October 30, 2005 || Kitt Peak || Spacewatch || — || align=right data-sort-value="0.87" | 870 m || 
|-id=179 bgcolor=#fefefe
| 475179 ||  || — || October 30, 2005 || Mount Lemmon || Mount Lemmon Survey || NYS || align=right data-sort-value="0.63" | 630 m || 
|-id=180 bgcolor=#d6d6d6
| 475180 ||  || — || October 22, 2005 || Kitt Peak || Spacewatch || — || align=right | 2.7 km || 
|-id=181 bgcolor=#d6d6d6
| 475181 ||  || — || October 22, 2005 || Catalina || CSS || — || align=right | 3.7 km || 
|-id=182 bgcolor=#fefefe
| 475182 ||  || — || October 23, 2005 || Palomar || NEAT || H || align=right data-sort-value="0.64" | 640 m || 
|-id=183 bgcolor=#d6d6d6
| 475183 ||  || — || September 14, 2005 || Socorro || LINEAR || — || align=right | 2.9 km || 
|-id=184 bgcolor=#d6d6d6
| 475184 ||  || — || October 27, 2005 || Socorro || LINEAR || — || align=right | 2.9 km || 
|-id=185 bgcolor=#d6d6d6
| 475185 ||  || — || October 23, 2005 || Catalina || CSS || — || align=right | 3.4 km || 
|-id=186 bgcolor=#fefefe
| 475186 ||  || — || October 25, 2005 || Kitt Peak || Spacewatch || — || align=right data-sort-value="0.71" | 710 m || 
|-id=187 bgcolor=#d6d6d6
| 475187 ||  || — || October 25, 2005 || Kitt Peak || Spacewatch || — || align=right | 2.7 km || 
|-id=188 bgcolor=#d6d6d6
| 475188 ||  || — || October 25, 2005 || Mount Lemmon || Mount Lemmon Survey || THM || align=right | 2.0 km || 
|-id=189 bgcolor=#d6d6d6
| 475189 ||  || — || October 28, 2005 || Mount Lemmon || Mount Lemmon Survey || — || align=right | 2.9 km || 
|-id=190 bgcolor=#d6d6d6
| 475190 ||  || — || October 20, 2005 || Apache Point || A. C. Becker || Tj (2.95) || align=right | 2.4 km || 
|-id=191 bgcolor=#d6d6d6
| 475191 ||  || — || October 25, 2005 || Apache Point || A. C. Becker || — || align=right | 2.7 km || 
|-id=192 bgcolor=#d6d6d6
| 475192 ||  || — || October 25, 2005 || Apache Point || A. C. Becker || — || align=right | 2.8 km || 
|-id=193 bgcolor=#d6d6d6
| 475193 ||  || — || October 25, 2005 || Apache Point || A. C. Becker || VER || align=right | 2.3 km || 
|-id=194 bgcolor=#d6d6d6
| 475194 ||  || — || October 25, 2005 || Apache Point || A. C. Becker || — || align=right | 2.9 km || 
|-id=195 bgcolor=#d6d6d6
| 475195 ||  || — || October 26, 2005 || Apache Point || A. C. Becker || — || align=right | 1.5 km || 
|-id=196 bgcolor=#d6d6d6
| 475196 ||  || — || October 27, 2005 || Apache Point || A. C. Becker || — || align=right | 2.2 km || 
|-id=197 bgcolor=#fefefe
| 475197 ||  || — || October 22, 2005 || Catalina || CSS || — || align=right data-sort-value="0.76" | 760 m || 
|-id=198 bgcolor=#FA8072
| 475198 ||  || — || October 30, 2005 || Catalina || CSS || critical || align=right | 1.0 km || 
|-id=199 bgcolor=#d6d6d6
| 475199 ||  || — || November 5, 2005 || Pla D'Arguines || Pla D'Arguines Obs. || Tj (2.99) || align=right | 3.6 km || 
|-id=200 bgcolor=#FA8072
| 475200 ||  || — || November 1, 2005 || Anderson Mesa || LONEOS || H || align=right data-sort-value="0.62" | 620 m || 
|}

475201–475300 

|-bgcolor=#d6d6d6
| 475201 ||  || — || November 10, 2005 || Gnosca || S. Sposetti || — || align=right | 2.5 km || 
|-id=202 bgcolor=#fefefe
| 475202 ||  || — || October 22, 2005 || Kitt Peak || Spacewatch || fast? || align=right data-sort-value="0.63" | 630 m || 
|-id=203 bgcolor=#fefefe
| 475203 ||  || — || November 2, 2005 || Mount Lemmon || Mount Lemmon Survey || — || align=right data-sort-value="0.71" | 710 m || 
|-id=204 bgcolor=#d6d6d6
| 475204 ||  || — || October 23, 2005 || Catalina || CSS || TIR || align=right | 3.2 km || 
|-id=205 bgcolor=#fefefe
| 475205 ||  || — || September 29, 2005 || Catalina || CSS || — || align=right | 1.2 km || 
|-id=206 bgcolor=#d6d6d6
| 475206 ||  || — || October 1, 2005 || Mount Lemmon || Mount Lemmon Survey || — || align=right | 2.7 km || 
|-id=207 bgcolor=#d6d6d6
| 475207 ||  || — || November 1, 2005 || Kitt Peak || Spacewatch || — || align=right | 2.6 km || 
|-id=208 bgcolor=#d6d6d6
| 475208 ||  || — || November 2, 2005 || Socorro || LINEAR || — || align=right | 3.9 km || 
|-id=209 bgcolor=#fefefe
| 475209 ||  || — || November 2, 2005 || Mount Lemmon || Mount Lemmon Survey || — || align=right data-sort-value="0.74" | 740 m || 
|-id=210 bgcolor=#d6d6d6
| 475210 ||  || — || September 25, 2005 || Kitt Peak || Spacewatch || — || align=right | 2.8 km || 
|-id=211 bgcolor=#fefefe
| 475211 ||  || — || November 3, 2005 || Mount Lemmon || Mount Lemmon Survey || — || align=right data-sort-value="0.81" | 810 m || 
|-id=212 bgcolor=#d6d6d6
| 475212 ||  || — || November 3, 2005 || Mount Lemmon || Mount Lemmon Survey || — || align=right | 2.6 km || 
|-id=213 bgcolor=#fefefe
| 475213 ||  || — || November 3, 2005 || Catalina || CSS || — || align=right data-sort-value="0.85" | 850 m || 
|-id=214 bgcolor=#d6d6d6
| 475214 ||  || — || November 3, 2005 || Mount Lemmon || Mount Lemmon Survey || — || align=right | 2.8 km || 
|-id=215 bgcolor=#fefefe
| 475215 ||  || — || September 30, 2005 || Mount Lemmon || Mount Lemmon Survey || — || align=right data-sort-value="0.86" | 860 m || 
|-id=216 bgcolor=#d6d6d6
| 475216 ||  || — || November 1, 2005 || Mount Lemmon || Mount Lemmon Survey || EOS || align=right | 1.6 km || 
|-id=217 bgcolor=#fefefe
| 475217 ||  || — || November 1, 2005 || Mount Lemmon || Mount Lemmon Survey || MAS || align=right data-sort-value="0.58" | 580 m || 
|-id=218 bgcolor=#d6d6d6
| 475218 ||  || — || November 1, 2005 || Mount Lemmon || Mount Lemmon Survey || — || align=right | 2.8 km || 
|-id=219 bgcolor=#d6d6d6
| 475219 ||  || — || November 3, 2005 || Mount Lemmon || Mount Lemmon Survey || VER || align=right | 2.1 km || 
|-id=220 bgcolor=#fefefe
| 475220 ||  || — || November 6, 2005 || Kitt Peak || Spacewatch || — || align=right data-sort-value="0.65" | 650 m || 
|-id=221 bgcolor=#d6d6d6
| 475221 ||  || — || October 25, 2005 || Kitt Peak || Spacewatch || — || align=right | 2.8 km || 
|-id=222 bgcolor=#d6d6d6
| 475222 ||  || — || October 30, 2005 || Mount Lemmon || Mount Lemmon Survey || — || align=right | 3.4 km || 
|-id=223 bgcolor=#d6d6d6
| 475223 ||  || — || October 26, 2005 || Kitt Peak || Spacewatch || LIX || align=right | 2.6 km || 
|-id=224 bgcolor=#d6d6d6
| 475224 ||  || — || November 7, 2005 || Socorro || LINEAR || — || align=right | 3.8 km || 
|-id=225 bgcolor=#d6d6d6
| 475225 ||  || — || October 25, 2005 || Kitt Peak || Spacewatch || — || align=right | 3.8 km || 
|-id=226 bgcolor=#fefefe
| 475226 ||  || — || November 6, 2005 || Mount Lemmon || Mount Lemmon Survey || NYS || align=right data-sort-value="0.53" | 530 m || 
|-id=227 bgcolor=#fefefe
| 475227 ||  || — || November 6, 2005 || Mount Lemmon || Mount Lemmon Survey || — || align=right data-sort-value="0.68" | 680 m || 
|-id=228 bgcolor=#d6d6d6
| 475228 ||  || — || November 7, 2005 || Socorro || LINEAR || EOS || align=right | 2.2 km || 
|-id=229 bgcolor=#fefefe
| 475229 ||  || — || October 27, 2005 || Mount Lemmon || Mount Lemmon Survey || — || align=right data-sort-value="0.65" | 650 m || 
|-id=230 bgcolor=#d6d6d6
| 475230 ||  || — || November 11, 2005 || Socorro || LINEAR || — || align=right | 4.2 km || 
|-id=231 bgcolor=#fefefe
| 475231 ||  || — || September 23, 2005 || Kitt Peak || Spacewatch || — || align=right data-sort-value="0.81" | 810 m || 
|-id=232 bgcolor=#d6d6d6
| 475232 ||  || — || November 1, 2005 || Apache Point || A. C. Becker || — || align=right | 2.6 km || 
|-id=233 bgcolor=#d6d6d6
| 475233 ||  || — || November 1, 2005 || Apache Point || A. C. Becker || — || align=right | 2.7 km || 
|-id=234 bgcolor=#d6d6d6
| 475234 ||  || — || November 19, 2005 || Mayhill || A. Lowe || — || align=right | 4.2 km || 
|-id=235 bgcolor=#d6d6d6
| 475235 ||  || — || November 10, 2005 || Catalina || CSS || — || align=right | 3.4 km || 
|-id=236 bgcolor=#d6d6d6
| 475236 ||  || — || November 23, 2005 || Socorro || LINEAR || — || align=right | 4.9 km || 
|-id=237 bgcolor=#d6d6d6
| 475237 ||  || — || November 22, 2005 || Kitt Peak || Spacewatch || — || align=right | 2.6 km || 
|-id=238 bgcolor=#d6d6d6
| 475238 ||  || — || November 22, 2005 || Kitt Peak || Spacewatch || — || align=right | 4.6 km || 
|-id=239 bgcolor=#fefefe
| 475239 ||  || — || November 22, 2005 || Kitt Peak || Spacewatch || MAS || align=right data-sort-value="0.56" | 560 m || 
|-id=240 bgcolor=#fefefe
| 475240 ||  || — || November 22, 2005 || Kitt Peak || Spacewatch || (5026) || align=right data-sort-value="0.68" | 680 m || 
|-id=241 bgcolor=#fefefe
| 475241 ||  || — || November 12, 2005 || Kitt Peak || Spacewatch || — || align=right data-sort-value="0.80" | 800 m || 
|-id=242 bgcolor=#d6d6d6
| 475242 ||  || — || November 21, 2005 || Kitt Peak || Spacewatch || — || align=right | 1.9 km || 
|-id=243 bgcolor=#fefefe
| 475243 ||  || — || November 21, 2005 || Kitt Peak || Spacewatch || V || align=right data-sort-value="0.67" | 670 m || 
|-id=244 bgcolor=#fefefe
| 475244 ||  || — || November 21, 2005 || Kitt Peak || Spacewatch || — || align=right data-sort-value="0.75" | 750 m || 
|-id=245 bgcolor=#d6d6d6
| 475245 ||  || — || November 21, 2005 || Kitt Peak || Spacewatch || LIX || align=right | 3.4 km || 
|-id=246 bgcolor=#fefefe
| 475246 ||  || — || November 21, 2005 || Kitt Peak || Spacewatch || — || align=right data-sort-value="0.58" | 580 m || 
|-id=247 bgcolor=#fefefe
| 475247 ||  || — || November 21, 2005 || Kitt Peak || Spacewatch || — || align=right data-sort-value="0.71" | 710 m || 
|-id=248 bgcolor=#d6d6d6
| 475248 ||  || — || November 21, 2005 || Kitt Peak || Spacewatch || — || align=right | 3.4 km || 
|-id=249 bgcolor=#fefefe
| 475249 ||  || — || November 22, 2005 || Kitt Peak || Spacewatch || — || align=right data-sort-value="0.79" | 790 m || 
|-id=250 bgcolor=#fefefe
| 475250 ||  || — || November 25, 2005 || Mount Lemmon || Mount Lemmon Survey || V || align=right data-sort-value="0.77" | 770 m || 
|-id=251 bgcolor=#fefefe
| 475251 ||  || — || November 22, 2005 || Kitt Peak || Spacewatch || — || align=right data-sort-value="0.98" | 980 m || 
|-id=252 bgcolor=#d6d6d6
| 475252 ||  || — || November 1, 2005 || Kitt Peak || Spacewatch || — || align=right | 3.1 km || 
|-id=253 bgcolor=#d6d6d6
| 475253 ||  || — || November 25, 2005 || Kitt Peak || Spacewatch || — || align=right | 2.8 km || 
|-id=254 bgcolor=#d6d6d6
| 475254 ||  || — || November 25, 2005 || Catalina || CSS || — || align=right | 3.3 km || 
|-id=255 bgcolor=#fefefe
| 475255 ||  || — || November 25, 2005 || Mount Lemmon || Mount Lemmon Survey || — || align=right data-sort-value="0.94" | 940 m || 
|-id=256 bgcolor=#fefefe
| 475256 ||  || — || November 22, 2005 || Kitt Peak || Spacewatch || — || align=right data-sort-value="0.74" | 740 m || 
|-id=257 bgcolor=#d6d6d6
| 475257 ||  || — || October 27, 2005 || Mount Lemmon || Mount Lemmon Survey || — || align=right | 3.1 km || 
|-id=258 bgcolor=#d6d6d6
| 475258 ||  || — || November 25, 2005 || Mount Lemmon || Mount Lemmon Survey || — || align=right | 2.5 km || 
|-id=259 bgcolor=#d6d6d6
| 475259 ||  || — || November 25, 2005 || Kitt Peak || Spacewatch || — || align=right | 3.6 km || 
|-id=260 bgcolor=#d6d6d6
| 475260 ||  || — || November 25, 2005 || Kitt Peak || Spacewatch || — || align=right | 3.1 km || 
|-id=261 bgcolor=#d6d6d6
| 475261 ||  || — || November 28, 2005 || Mount Lemmon || Mount Lemmon Survey || — || align=right | 3.6 km || 
|-id=262 bgcolor=#d6d6d6
| 475262 ||  || — || October 23, 2005 || Catalina || CSS || — || align=right | 4.1 km || 
|-id=263 bgcolor=#fefefe
| 475263 ||  || — || November 21, 2005 || Catalina || CSS || — || align=right data-sort-value="0.87" | 870 m || 
|-id=264 bgcolor=#d6d6d6
| 475264 ||  || — || November 25, 2005 || Mount Lemmon || Mount Lemmon Survey || — || align=right | 2.6 km || 
|-id=265 bgcolor=#d6d6d6
| 475265 ||  || — || November 12, 2005 || Catalina || CSS || Tj (2.98) || align=right | 3.0 km || 
|-id=266 bgcolor=#fefefe
| 475266 ||  || — || November 26, 2005 || Catalina || CSS || H || align=right data-sort-value="0.87" | 870 m || 
|-id=267 bgcolor=#d6d6d6
| 475267 ||  || — || November 26, 2005 || Catalina || CSS || Tj (2.99) || align=right | 5.4 km || 
|-id=268 bgcolor=#fefefe
| 475268 ||  || — || November 30, 2005 || Mount Lemmon || Mount Lemmon Survey || — || align=right data-sort-value="0.69" | 690 m || 
|-id=269 bgcolor=#fefefe
| 475269 ||  || — || November 25, 2005 || Mount Lemmon || Mount Lemmon Survey || MAS || align=right data-sort-value="0.71" | 710 m || 
|-id=270 bgcolor=#d6d6d6
| 475270 ||  || — || November 25, 2005 || Kitt Peak || Spacewatch || THM || align=right | 1.9 km || 
|-id=271 bgcolor=#d6d6d6
| 475271 ||  || — || November 25, 2005 || Mount Lemmon || Mount Lemmon Survey || — || align=right | 2.6 km || 
|-id=272 bgcolor=#d6d6d6
| 475272 ||  || — || November 25, 2005 || Mount Lemmon || Mount Lemmon Survey || — || align=right | 4.2 km || 
|-id=273 bgcolor=#fefefe
| 475273 ||  || — || October 25, 2005 || Mount Lemmon || Mount Lemmon Survey || — || align=right data-sort-value="0.78" | 780 m || 
|-id=274 bgcolor=#d6d6d6
| 475274 ||  || — || October 27, 2005 || Mount Lemmon || Mount Lemmon Survey || — || align=right | 2.6 km || 
|-id=275 bgcolor=#d6d6d6
| 475275 ||  || — || October 27, 2005 || Mount Lemmon || Mount Lemmon Survey || — || align=right | 3.0 km || 
|-id=276 bgcolor=#d6d6d6
| 475276 ||  || — || November 26, 2005 || Mount Lemmon || Mount Lemmon Survey || HYG || align=right | 2.1 km || 
|-id=277 bgcolor=#d6d6d6
| 475277 ||  || — || November 29, 2005 || Mount Lemmon || Mount Lemmon Survey || THM || align=right | 2.7 km || 
|-id=278 bgcolor=#fefefe
| 475278 ||  || — || November 25, 2005 || Kitt Peak || Spacewatch || — || align=right data-sort-value="0.70" | 700 m || 
|-id=279 bgcolor=#d6d6d6
| 475279 ||  || — || November 26, 2005 || Catalina || CSS || — || align=right | 3.3 km || 
|-id=280 bgcolor=#fefefe
| 475280 ||  || — || November 28, 2005 || Kitt Peak || Spacewatch || — || align=right data-sort-value="0.74" | 740 m || 
|-id=281 bgcolor=#d6d6d6
| 475281 ||  || — || October 29, 2005 || Kitt Peak || Spacewatch || — || align=right | 3.5 km || 
|-id=282 bgcolor=#d6d6d6
| 475282 ||  || — || November 28, 2005 || Catalina || CSS || — || align=right | 4.4 km || 
|-id=283 bgcolor=#fefefe
| 475283 ||  || — || November 21, 2005 || Kitt Peak || Spacewatch || — || align=right data-sort-value="0.79" | 790 m || 
|-id=284 bgcolor=#d6d6d6
| 475284 ||  || — || November 29, 2005 || Kitt Peak || Spacewatch || — || align=right | 3.7 km || 
|-id=285 bgcolor=#fefefe
| 475285 ||  || — || November 29, 2005 || Kitt Peak || Spacewatch || V || align=right data-sort-value="0.62" | 620 m || 
|-id=286 bgcolor=#d6d6d6
| 475286 ||  || — || November 29, 2005 || Kitt Peak || Spacewatch || — || align=right | 5.4 km || 
|-id=287 bgcolor=#fefefe
| 475287 ||  || — || November 4, 2005 || Kitt Peak || Spacewatch || — || align=right data-sort-value="0.58" | 580 m || 
|-id=288 bgcolor=#fefefe
| 475288 ||  || — || November 30, 2005 || Mount Lemmon || Mount Lemmon Survey || — || align=right | 1.4 km || 
|-id=289 bgcolor=#fefefe
| 475289 ||  || — || December 1, 2005 || Socorro || LINEAR || — || align=right data-sort-value="0.70" | 700 m || 
|-id=290 bgcolor=#d6d6d6
| 475290 ||  || — || November 1, 2005 || Mount Lemmon || Mount Lemmon Survey || LIX || align=right | 4.3 km || 
|-id=291 bgcolor=#fefefe
| 475291 ||  || — || December 2, 2005 || Kitt Peak || Spacewatch || — || align=right data-sort-value="0.89" | 890 m || 
|-id=292 bgcolor=#d6d6d6
| 475292 ||  || — || December 4, 2005 || Catalina || CSS || TIR || align=right | 3.1 km || 
|-id=293 bgcolor=#d6d6d6
| 475293 ||  || — || December 1, 2005 || Kitt Peak || Spacewatch || — || align=right | 2.7 km || 
|-id=294 bgcolor=#fefefe
| 475294 ||  || — || December 4, 2005 || Kitt Peak || Spacewatch || NYS || align=right data-sort-value="0.48" | 480 m || 
|-id=295 bgcolor=#d6d6d6
| 475295 ||  || — || November 30, 2005 || Kitt Peak || Spacewatch || — || align=right | 3.6 km || 
|-id=296 bgcolor=#d6d6d6
| 475296 ||  || — || November 26, 2005 || Kitt Peak || Spacewatch || — || align=right | 3.0 km || 
|-id=297 bgcolor=#FA8072
| 475297 ||  || — || December 2, 2005 || Socorro || LINEAR || — || align=right | 1.1 km || 
|-id=298 bgcolor=#fefefe
| 475298 ||  || — || December 2, 2005 || Kitt Peak || Spacewatch || — || align=right data-sort-value="0.74" | 740 m || 
|-id=299 bgcolor=#fefefe
| 475299 ||  || — || December 5, 2005 || Kitt Peak || Spacewatch || — || align=right data-sort-value="0.66" | 660 m || 
|-id=300 bgcolor=#fefefe
| 475300 ||  || — || December 5, 2005 || Mount Lemmon || Mount Lemmon Survey || MAS || align=right data-sort-value="0.56" | 560 m || 
|}

475301–475400 

|-bgcolor=#d6d6d6
| 475301 ||  || — || December 6, 2005 || Kitt Peak || Spacewatch || — || align=right | 2.4 km || 
|-id=302 bgcolor=#fefefe
| 475302 ||  || — || December 6, 2005 || Kitt Peak || Spacewatch || NYS || align=right data-sort-value="0.66" | 660 m || 
|-id=303 bgcolor=#E9E9E9
| 475303 ||  || — || December 6, 2005 || Kitt Peak || Spacewatch || MAR || align=right data-sort-value="0.92" | 920 m || 
|-id=304 bgcolor=#d6d6d6
| 475304 ||  || — || December 10, 2005 || Calvin-Rehoboth || Calvin–Rehoboth Obs. || — || align=right | 3.2 km || 
|-id=305 bgcolor=#FA8072
| 475305 ||  || — || December 8, 2005 || Catalina || CSS || — || align=right data-sort-value="0.79" | 790 m || 
|-id=306 bgcolor=#d6d6d6
| 475306 ||  || — || December 21, 2005 || Catalina || CSS || Tj (2.99) || align=right | 2.9 km || 
|-id=307 bgcolor=#E9E9E9
| 475307 ||  || — || December 10, 2005 || Kitt Peak || Spacewatch || — || align=right data-sort-value="0.91" | 910 m || 
|-id=308 bgcolor=#fefefe
| 475308 ||  || — || December 22, 2005 || Kitt Peak || Spacewatch || — || align=right data-sort-value="0.71" | 710 m || 
|-id=309 bgcolor=#fefefe
| 475309 ||  || — || December 24, 2005 || Kitt Peak || Spacewatch || MAS || align=right data-sort-value="0.59" | 590 m || 
|-id=310 bgcolor=#fefefe
| 475310 ||  || — || December 25, 2005 || Kitt Peak || Spacewatch || — || align=right data-sort-value="0.79" | 790 m || 
|-id=311 bgcolor=#fefefe
| 475311 ||  || — || December 22, 2005 || Kitt Peak || Spacewatch || — || align=right data-sort-value="0.64" | 640 m || 
|-id=312 bgcolor=#fefefe
| 475312 ||  || — || December 25, 2005 || Kitt Peak || Spacewatch || MAS || align=right data-sort-value="0.60" | 600 m || 
|-id=313 bgcolor=#fefefe
| 475313 ||  || — || December 5, 2005 || Kitt Peak || Spacewatch || — || align=right data-sort-value="0.63" | 630 m || 
|-id=314 bgcolor=#fefefe
| 475314 ||  || — || December 24, 2005 || Kitt Peak || Spacewatch || — || align=right data-sort-value="0.79" | 790 m || 
|-id=315 bgcolor=#fefefe
| 475315 ||  || — || December 24, 2005 || Kitt Peak || Spacewatch || NYS || align=right data-sort-value="0.52" | 520 m || 
|-id=316 bgcolor=#d6d6d6
| 475316 ||  || — || December 25, 2005 || Mount Lemmon || Mount Lemmon Survey || THB || align=right | 2.6 km || 
|-id=317 bgcolor=#fefefe
| 475317 ||  || — || December 25, 2005 || Kitt Peak || Spacewatch || — || align=right data-sort-value="0.83" | 830 m || 
|-id=318 bgcolor=#fefefe
| 475318 ||  || — || December 27, 2005 || Catalina || CSS || — || align=right data-sort-value="0.82" | 820 m || 
|-id=319 bgcolor=#d6d6d6
| 475319 ||  || — || December 25, 2005 || Kitt Peak || Spacewatch || — || align=right | 3.4 km || 
|-id=320 bgcolor=#fefefe
| 475320 ||  || — || December 27, 2005 || Kitt Peak || Spacewatch || — || align=right | 1.4 km || 
|-id=321 bgcolor=#fefefe
| 475321 ||  || — || December 27, 2005 || Kitt Peak || Spacewatch || NYS || align=right data-sort-value="0.63" | 630 m || 
|-id=322 bgcolor=#E9E9E9
| 475322 ||  || — || December 28, 2005 || Kitt Peak || Spacewatch || — || align=right data-sort-value="0.94" | 940 m || 
|-id=323 bgcolor=#E9E9E9
| 475323 ||  || — || December 25, 2005 || Kitt Peak || Spacewatch || — || align=right | 2.0 km || 
|-id=324 bgcolor=#E9E9E9
| 475324 ||  || — || December 25, 2005 || Mount Lemmon || Mount Lemmon Survey || — || align=right | 1.1 km || 
|-id=325 bgcolor=#fefefe
| 475325 ||  || — || December 28, 2005 || Mount Lemmon || Mount Lemmon Survey || — || align=right data-sort-value="0.93" | 930 m || 
|-id=326 bgcolor=#fefefe
| 475326 ||  || — || December 4, 2005 || Mount Lemmon || Mount Lemmon Survey || — || align=right data-sort-value="0.80" | 800 m || 
|-id=327 bgcolor=#fefefe
| 475327 ||  || — || December 25, 2005 || Mount Lemmon || Mount Lemmon Survey || MAS || align=right data-sort-value="0.53" | 530 m || 
|-id=328 bgcolor=#fefefe
| 475328 ||  || — || December 28, 2005 || Mount Lemmon || Mount Lemmon Survey || — || align=right data-sort-value="0.71" | 710 m || 
|-id=329 bgcolor=#E9E9E9
| 475329 ||  || — || December 28, 2005 || Mount Lemmon || Mount Lemmon Survey || — || align=right | 1.9 km || 
|-id=330 bgcolor=#fefefe
| 475330 ||  || — || December 24, 2005 || Kitt Peak || Spacewatch || — || align=right data-sort-value="0.85" | 850 m || 
|-id=331 bgcolor=#fefefe
| 475331 ||  || — || January 5, 2006 || Kitt Peak || Spacewatch || — || align=right | 1.0 km || 
|-id=332 bgcolor=#fefefe
| 475332 ||  || — || January 5, 2006 || Mount Lemmon || Mount Lemmon Survey || MAS || align=right data-sort-value="0.68" | 680 m || 
|-id=333 bgcolor=#fefefe
| 475333 ||  || — || December 25, 2005 || Kitt Peak || Spacewatch || — || align=right data-sort-value="0.79" | 790 m || 
|-id=334 bgcolor=#E9E9E9
| 475334 ||  || — || January 4, 2006 || Kitt Peak || Spacewatch || — || align=right data-sort-value="0.72" | 720 m || 
|-id=335 bgcolor=#d6d6d6
| 475335 ||  || — || January 6, 2006 || Kitt Peak || Spacewatch || 7:4 || align=right | 3.6 km || 
|-id=336 bgcolor=#fefefe
| 475336 ||  || — || January 5, 2006 || Mount Lemmon || Mount Lemmon Survey || — || align=right | 1.0 km || 
|-id=337 bgcolor=#E9E9E9
| 475337 ||  || — || January 7, 2006 || Mount Lemmon || Mount Lemmon Survey || — || align=right data-sort-value="0.79" | 790 m || 
|-id=338 bgcolor=#E9E9E9
| 475338 ||  || — || January 7, 2006 || Mount Lemmon || Mount Lemmon Survey || — || align=right | 1.5 km || 
|-id=339 bgcolor=#fefefe
| 475339 ||  || — || January 7, 2006 || Mount Lemmon || Mount Lemmon Survey || V || align=right data-sort-value="0.55" | 550 m || 
|-id=340 bgcolor=#fefefe
| 475340 ||  || — || January 5, 2006 || Mount Lemmon || Mount Lemmon Survey || NYS || align=right data-sort-value="0.53" | 530 m || 
|-id=341 bgcolor=#E9E9E9
| 475341 ||  || — || January 7, 2006 || Kitt Peak || Spacewatch || — || align=right data-sort-value="0.91" | 910 m || 
|-id=342 bgcolor=#fefefe
| 475342 ||  || — || January 23, 2006 || Kitt Peak || Spacewatch || — || align=right data-sort-value="0.60" | 600 m || 
|-id=343 bgcolor=#fefefe
| 475343 ||  || — || January 23, 2006 || Kitt Peak || Spacewatch || — || align=right data-sort-value="0.92" | 920 m || 
|-id=344 bgcolor=#fefefe
| 475344 ||  || — || January 28, 2006 || 7300 || W. K. Y. Yeung || — || align=right data-sort-value="0.98" | 980 m || 
|-id=345 bgcolor=#fefefe
| 475345 ||  || — || January 25, 2006 || Kitt Peak || Spacewatch || — || align=right data-sort-value="0.89" | 890 m || 
|-id=346 bgcolor=#fefefe
| 475346 ||  || — || January 25, 2006 || Kitt Peak || Spacewatch || MAS || align=right data-sort-value="0.77" | 770 m || 
|-id=347 bgcolor=#E9E9E9
| 475347 ||  || — || January 25, 2006 || Kitt Peak || Spacewatch || critical || align=right | 1.1 km || 
|-id=348 bgcolor=#fefefe
| 475348 ||  || — || December 2, 2005 || Mount Lemmon || Mount Lemmon Survey || MAS || align=right data-sort-value="0.70" | 700 m || 
|-id=349 bgcolor=#E9E9E9
| 475349 ||  || — || January 23, 2006 || Kitt Peak || Spacewatch || — || align=right data-sort-value="0.82" | 820 m || 
|-id=350 bgcolor=#E9E9E9
| 475350 ||  || — || January 26, 2006 || Kitt Peak || Spacewatch || — || align=right data-sort-value="0.98" | 980 m || 
|-id=351 bgcolor=#E9E9E9
| 475351 ||  || — || January 26, 2006 || Kitt Peak || Spacewatch || — || align=right | 1.6 km || 
|-id=352 bgcolor=#E9E9E9
| 475352 ||  || — || January 30, 2006 || Kitt Peak || Spacewatch || — || align=right data-sort-value="0.86" | 860 m || 
|-id=353 bgcolor=#E9E9E9
| 475353 ||  || — || January 23, 2006 || Mount Lemmon || Mount Lemmon Survey || — || align=right data-sort-value="0.94" | 940 m || 
|-id=354 bgcolor=#FFC2E0
| 475354 ||  || — || February 1, 2006 || Catalina || CSS || AMO || align=right data-sort-value="0.68" | 680 m || 
|-id=355 bgcolor=#E9E9E9
| 475355 ||  || — || February 1, 2006 || Mount Lemmon || Mount Lemmon Survey || — || align=right | 1.1 km || 
|-id=356 bgcolor=#E9E9E9
| 475356 ||  || — || January 9, 2006 || Kitt Peak || Spacewatch || MAR || align=right | 1.00 km || 
|-id=357 bgcolor=#fefefe
| 475357 ||  || — || February 1, 2006 || Kitt Peak || Spacewatch || — || align=right data-sort-value="0.70" | 700 m || 
|-id=358 bgcolor=#fefefe
| 475358 ||  || — || February 1, 2006 || Kitt Peak || Spacewatch || — || align=right data-sort-value="0.72" | 720 m || 
|-id=359 bgcolor=#E9E9E9
| 475359 ||  || — || February 2, 2006 || Kitt Peak || Spacewatch || — || align=right | 1.0 km || 
|-id=360 bgcolor=#fefefe
| 475360 ||  || — || January 23, 2006 || Mount Lemmon || Mount Lemmon Survey || — || align=right data-sort-value="0.66" | 660 m || 
|-id=361 bgcolor=#E9E9E9
| 475361 ||  || — || February 1, 2006 || Kitt Peak || Spacewatch || — || align=right | 1.1 km || 
|-id=362 bgcolor=#E9E9E9
| 475362 ||  || — || February 2, 2006 || Mount Lemmon || Mount Lemmon Survey || — || align=right data-sort-value="0.96" | 960 m || 
|-id=363 bgcolor=#E9E9E9
| 475363 ||  || — || February 20, 2006 || Mount Lemmon || Mount Lemmon Survey || — || align=right | 1.5 km || 
|-id=364 bgcolor=#E9E9E9
| 475364 ||  || — || February 20, 2006 || Mount Lemmon || Mount Lemmon Survey || — || align=right | 1.8 km || 
|-id=365 bgcolor=#E9E9E9
| 475365 ||  || — || February 20, 2006 || Kitt Peak || Spacewatch || — || align=right data-sort-value="0.91" | 910 m || 
|-id=366 bgcolor=#E9E9E9
| 475366 ||  || — || February 20, 2006 || Kitt Peak || Spacewatch || — || align=right | 1.1 km || 
|-id=367 bgcolor=#E9E9E9
| 475367 ||  || — || February 27, 2006 || Kitt Peak || Spacewatch || — || align=right | 1.0 km || 
|-id=368 bgcolor=#E9E9E9
| 475368 ||  || — || February 27, 2006 || Kitt Peak || Spacewatch || — || align=right | 2.1 km || 
|-id=369 bgcolor=#E9E9E9
| 475369 ||  || — || January 25, 2006 || Kitt Peak || Spacewatch || MAR || align=right data-sort-value="0.85" | 850 m || 
|-id=370 bgcolor=#E9E9E9
| 475370 ||  || — || February 25, 2006 || Kitt Peak || Spacewatch || — || align=right | 1.5 km || 
|-id=371 bgcolor=#E9E9E9
| 475371 ||  || — || February 25, 2006 || Kitt Peak || Spacewatch || — || align=right | 1.3 km || 
|-id=372 bgcolor=#E9E9E9
| 475372 ||  || — || February 25, 2006 || Kitt Peak || Spacewatch || — || align=right | 1.1 km || 
|-id=373 bgcolor=#E9E9E9
| 475373 ||  || — || February 27, 2006 || Kitt Peak || Spacewatch || — || align=right data-sort-value="0.81" | 810 m || 
|-id=374 bgcolor=#E9E9E9
| 475374 ||  || — || February 21, 2006 || Mount Lemmon || Mount Lemmon Survey || — || align=right data-sort-value="0.87" | 870 m || 
|-id=375 bgcolor=#E9E9E9
| 475375 ||  || — || March 3, 2006 || Nyukasa || Mount Nyukasa Stn. || (5) || align=right data-sort-value="0.85" | 850 m || 
|-id=376 bgcolor=#E9E9E9
| 475376 ||  || — || March 2, 2006 || Mount Lemmon || Mount Lemmon Survey || — || align=right | 1.7 km || 
|-id=377 bgcolor=#E9E9E9
| 475377 ||  || — || March 3, 2006 || Kitt Peak || Spacewatch || — || align=right | 1.0 km || 
|-id=378 bgcolor=#E9E9E9
| 475378 ||  || — || March 9, 2006 || Kitt Peak || Spacewatch || RAF || align=right data-sort-value="0.87" | 870 m || 
|-id=379 bgcolor=#E9E9E9
| 475379 ||  || — || March 23, 2006 || Kitt Peak || Spacewatch || — || align=right | 1.4 km || 
|-id=380 bgcolor=#E9E9E9
| 475380 ||  || — || March 24, 2006 || Kitt Peak || Spacewatch || — || align=right | 1.2 km || 
|-id=381 bgcolor=#E9E9E9
| 475381 ||  || — || March 25, 2006 || Kitt Peak || Spacewatch || MAR || align=right | 1.1 km || 
|-id=382 bgcolor=#E9E9E9
| 475382 ||  || — || April 5, 2002 || Kitt Peak || Spacewatch || — || align=right data-sort-value="0.92" | 920 m || 
|-id=383 bgcolor=#E9E9E9
| 475383 ||  || — || April 2, 2006 || Kitt Peak || Spacewatch || — || align=right | 2.3 km || 
|-id=384 bgcolor=#d6d6d6
| 475384 ||  || — || April 2, 2006 || Kitt Peak || Spacewatch || 3:2 || align=right | 4.6 km || 
|-id=385 bgcolor=#E9E9E9
| 475385 ||  || — || March 23, 2006 || Kitt Peak || Spacewatch || AEO || align=right | 1.1 km || 
|-id=386 bgcolor=#E9E9E9
| 475386 ||  || — || February 27, 2006 || Kitt Peak || Spacewatch || — || align=right | 1.6 km || 
|-id=387 bgcolor=#E9E9E9
| 475387 ||  || — || April 2, 2006 || Kitt Peak || Spacewatch || — || align=right | 2.1 km || 
|-id=388 bgcolor=#E9E9E9
| 475388 ||  || — || April 2, 2006 || Catalina || CSS || — || align=right | 1.8 km || 
|-id=389 bgcolor=#E9E9E9
| 475389 ||  || — || April 7, 2006 || Anderson Mesa || LONEOS || — || align=right | 1.6 km || 
|-id=390 bgcolor=#FA8072
| 475390 ||  || — || April 19, 2006 || Palomar || NEAT || — || align=right data-sort-value="0.59" | 590 m || 
|-id=391 bgcolor=#FA8072
| 475391 ||  || — || April 2, 2006 || Catalina || CSS || — || align=right data-sort-value="0.73" | 730 m || 
|-id=392 bgcolor=#E9E9E9
| 475392 ||  || — || April 19, 2006 || Kitt Peak || Spacewatch || — || align=right | 1.2 km || 
|-id=393 bgcolor=#E9E9E9
| 475393 ||  || — || April 20, 2006 || Kitt Peak || Spacewatch || — || align=right | 1.6 km || 
|-id=394 bgcolor=#E9E9E9
| 475394 ||  || — || April 24, 2006 || Mount Lemmon || Mount Lemmon Survey || — || align=right | 2.3 km || 
|-id=395 bgcolor=#E9E9E9
| 475395 ||  || — || April 8, 2006 || Kitt Peak || Spacewatch || — || align=right | 1.5 km || 
|-id=396 bgcolor=#E9E9E9
| 475396 ||  || — || April 19, 2006 || Catalina || CSS || (194) || align=right | 2.3 km || 
|-id=397 bgcolor=#E9E9E9
| 475397 ||  || — || April 25, 2006 || Kitt Peak || Spacewatch || — || align=right | 1.0 km || 
|-id=398 bgcolor=#E9E9E9
| 475398 ||  || — || April 30, 2006 || Kitt Peak || Spacewatch || — || align=right | 1.9 km || 
|-id=399 bgcolor=#E9E9E9
| 475399 ||  || — || April 30, 2006 || Kitt Peak || Spacewatch || EUN || align=right | 1.2 km || 
|-id=400 bgcolor=#E9E9E9
| 475400 ||  || — || April 9, 2006 || Kitt Peak || Spacewatch || — || align=right | 1.7 km || 
|}

475401–475500 

|-bgcolor=#E9E9E9
| 475401 ||  || — || April 21, 2006 || Kitt Peak || Spacewatch || — || align=right | 1.5 km || 
|-id=402 bgcolor=#E9E9E9
| 475402 ||  || — || May 1, 2006 || Kitt Peak || Spacewatch || — || align=right | 1.7 km || 
|-id=403 bgcolor=#E9E9E9
| 475403 ||  || — || April 19, 2006 || Kitt Peak || Spacewatch || — || align=right | 1.5 km || 
|-id=404 bgcolor=#E9E9E9
| 475404 ||  || — || May 2, 2006 || Mount Lemmon || Mount Lemmon Survey || — || align=right | 1.3 km || 
|-id=405 bgcolor=#E9E9E9
| 475405 ||  || — || April 8, 2006 || Kitt Peak || Spacewatch || — || align=right | 1.7 km || 
|-id=406 bgcolor=#E9E9E9
| 475406 ||  || — || April 24, 2006 || Kitt Peak || Spacewatch || — || align=right | 1.5 km || 
|-id=407 bgcolor=#E9E9E9
| 475407 ||  || — || May 2, 2006 || Kitt Peak || Spacewatch || — || align=right | 1.9 km || 
|-id=408 bgcolor=#E9E9E9
| 475408 ||  || — || April 21, 2006 || Kitt Peak || Spacewatch ||  || align=right | 2.1 km || 
|-id=409 bgcolor=#E9E9E9
| 475409 ||  || — || May 3, 2006 || Kitt Peak || Spacewatch || — || align=right | 1.5 km || 
|-id=410 bgcolor=#E9E9E9
| 475410 ||  || — || April 21, 2006 || Catalina || CSS || MAR || align=right | 1.3 km || 
|-id=411 bgcolor=#E9E9E9
| 475411 ||  || — || May 20, 2006 || Kitt Peak || Spacewatch || — || align=right | 1.7 km || 
|-id=412 bgcolor=#E9E9E9
| 475412 ||  || — || May 20, 2006 || Kitt Peak || Spacewatch || — || align=right | 1.9 km || 
|-id=413 bgcolor=#E9E9E9
| 475413 ||  || — || May 20, 2006 || Kitt Peak || Spacewatch || — || align=right | 2.0 km || 
|-id=414 bgcolor=#E9E9E9
| 475414 ||  || — || May 20, 2006 || Palomar || NEAT || — || align=right | 1.8 km || 
|-id=415 bgcolor=#E9E9E9
| 475415 ||  || — || May 21, 2006 || Kitt Peak || Spacewatch || — || align=right | 2.4 km || 
|-id=416 bgcolor=#E9E9E9
| 475416 ||  || — || May 19, 2006 || Mount Lemmon || Mount Lemmon Survey || — || align=right | 1.6 km || 
|-id=417 bgcolor=#E9E9E9
| 475417 ||  || — || May 6, 2006 || Mount Lemmon || Mount Lemmon Survey || — || align=right | 1.6 km || 
|-id=418 bgcolor=#E9E9E9
| 475418 ||  || — || May 20, 2006 || Kitt Peak || Spacewatch || — || align=right | 1.6 km || 
|-id=419 bgcolor=#E9E9E9
| 475419 ||  || — || October 2, 2003 || Kitt Peak || Spacewatch || — || align=right | 1.8 km || 
|-id=420 bgcolor=#E9E9E9
| 475420 ||  || — || May 7, 2006 || Kitt Peak || Spacewatch || — || align=right | 2.1 km || 
|-id=421 bgcolor=#E9E9E9
| 475421 ||  || — || May 25, 2006 || Mount Lemmon || Mount Lemmon Survey || — || align=right | 1.7 km || 
|-id=422 bgcolor=#E9E9E9
| 475422 ||  || — || May 25, 2006 || Mount Lemmon || Mount Lemmon Survey || — || align=right data-sort-value="0.87" | 870 m || 
|-id=423 bgcolor=#E9E9E9
| 475423 ||  || — || May 28, 2006 || Reedy Creek || J. Broughton || — || align=right | 1.6 km || 
|-id=424 bgcolor=#E9E9E9
| 475424 ||  || — || May 25, 2006 || Mount Lemmon || Mount Lemmon Survey || — || align=right | 1.6 km || 
|-id=425 bgcolor=#E9E9E9
| 475425 ||  || — || June 18, 2006 || Kitt Peak || Spacewatch || — || align=right | 2.2 km || 
|-id=426 bgcolor=#E9E9E9
| 475426 ||  || — || August 2, 2006 || Pla D'Arguines || R. Ferrando || GEF || align=right | 1.5 km || 
|-id=427 bgcolor=#fefefe
| 475427 ||  || — || August 13, 2006 || Palomar || NEAT || — || align=right data-sort-value="0.61" | 610 m || 
|-id=428 bgcolor=#E9E9E9
| 475428 ||  || — || June 22, 2006 || Siding Spring || SSS || — || align=right | 2.6 km || 
|-id=429 bgcolor=#d6d6d6
| 475429 ||  || — || August 19, 2006 || Kitt Peak || Spacewatch || KOR || align=right | 1.4 km || 
|-id=430 bgcolor=#fefefe
| 475430 ||  || — || August 16, 2006 || Siding Spring || SSS || — || align=right data-sort-value="0.78" | 780 m || 
|-id=431 bgcolor=#fefefe
| 475431 ||  || — || August 17, 2006 || Palomar || NEAT || — || align=right data-sort-value="0.64" | 640 m || 
|-id=432 bgcolor=#fefefe
| 475432 ||  || — || August 19, 2006 || Kitt Peak || Spacewatch || — || align=right data-sort-value="0.55" | 550 m || 
|-id=433 bgcolor=#fefefe
| 475433 ||  || — || July 25, 2006 || Mount Lemmon || Mount Lemmon Survey || — || align=right data-sort-value="0.60" | 600 m || 
|-id=434 bgcolor=#d6d6d6
| 475434 ||  || — || September 16, 2001 || Socorro || LINEAR || — || align=right | 2.4 km || 
|-id=435 bgcolor=#d6d6d6
| 475435 ||  || — || July 30, 2006 || Siding Spring || SSS || — || align=right | 2.5 km || 
|-id=436 bgcolor=#d6d6d6
| 475436 ||  || — || August 18, 2006 || Kitt Peak || Spacewatch || — || align=right | 2.4 km || 
|-id=437 bgcolor=#d6d6d6
| 475437 ||  || — || August 21, 2006 || Kitt Peak || Spacewatch || BRA || align=right | 1.6 km || 
|-id=438 bgcolor=#d6d6d6
| 475438 ||  || — || August 22, 2006 || Cerro Tololo || M. W. Buie || — || align=right | 2.0 km || 
|-id=439 bgcolor=#d6d6d6
| 475439 ||  || — || August 21, 2006 || Kitt Peak || Spacewatch || — || align=right | 1.7 km || 
|-id=440 bgcolor=#d6d6d6
| 475440 ||  || — || August 27, 2006 || Kitt Peak || Spacewatch || KOR || align=right | 1.3 km || 
|-id=441 bgcolor=#fefefe
| 475441 ||  || — || August 21, 2006 || Kitt Peak || Spacewatch || — || align=right data-sort-value="0.67" | 670 m || 
|-id=442 bgcolor=#d6d6d6
| 475442 ||  || — || August 27, 2006 || Kitt Peak || Spacewatch || KOR || align=right | 1.4 km || 
|-id=443 bgcolor=#fefefe
| 475443 ||  || — || September 14, 2006 || Kitt Peak || Spacewatch || fast || align=right data-sort-value="0.57" | 570 m || 
|-id=444 bgcolor=#d6d6d6
| 475444 ||  || — || September 14, 2006 || Catalina || CSS || TRE || align=right | 3.2 km || 
|-id=445 bgcolor=#fefefe
| 475445 ||  || — || September 14, 2006 || Kitt Peak || Spacewatch || — || align=right data-sort-value="0.67" | 670 m || 
|-id=446 bgcolor=#fefefe
| 475446 ||  || — || September 14, 2006 || Kitt Peak || Spacewatch || — || align=right data-sort-value="0.60" | 600 m || 
|-id=447 bgcolor=#fefefe
| 475447 ||  || — || September 14, 2006 || Kitt Peak || Spacewatch || H || align=right data-sort-value="0.62" | 620 m || 
|-id=448 bgcolor=#d6d6d6
| 475448 ||  || — || September 14, 2006 || Kitt Peak || Spacewatch || EOS || align=right | 1.5 km || 
|-id=449 bgcolor=#d6d6d6
| 475449 ||  || — || September 14, 2006 || Kitt Peak || Spacewatch || — || align=right | 1.6 km || 
|-id=450 bgcolor=#fefefe
| 475450 ||  || — || September 15, 2006 || Kitt Peak || Spacewatch || — || align=right data-sort-value="0.69" | 690 m || 
|-id=451 bgcolor=#fefefe
| 475451 ||  || — || September 14, 2006 || Catalina || CSS || — || align=right data-sort-value="0.79" | 790 m || 
|-id=452 bgcolor=#d6d6d6
| 475452 ||  || — || September 14, 2006 || Kitt Peak || Spacewatch || — || align=right | 2.8 km || 
|-id=453 bgcolor=#d6d6d6
| 475453 ||  || — || September 15, 2006 || Kitt Peak || Spacewatch || — || align=right | 2.1 km || 
|-id=454 bgcolor=#d6d6d6
| 475454 ||  || — || September 15, 2006 || Kitt Peak || Spacewatch || — || align=right | 1.9 km || 
|-id=455 bgcolor=#d6d6d6
| 475455 ||  || — || September 15, 2006 || Kitt Peak || Spacewatch || — || align=right | 2.2 km || 
|-id=456 bgcolor=#d6d6d6
| 475456 ||  || — || September 15, 2006 || Kitt Peak || Spacewatch || — || align=right | 2.0 km || 
|-id=457 bgcolor=#d6d6d6
| 475457 ||  || — || September 15, 2006 || Kitt Peak || Spacewatch || — || align=right | 2.2 km || 
|-id=458 bgcolor=#d6d6d6
| 475458 ||  || — || September 15, 2006 || Kitt Peak || Spacewatch || BRA || align=right | 1.4 km || 
|-id=459 bgcolor=#fefefe
| 475459 ||  || — || September 15, 2006 || Kitt Peak || Spacewatch || — || align=right data-sort-value="0.49" | 490 m || 
|-id=460 bgcolor=#fefefe
| 475460 ||  || — || September 15, 2006 || Kitt Peak || Spacewatch || — || align=right data-sort-value="0.69" | 690 m || 
|-id=461 bgcolor=#d6d6d6
| 475461 ||  || — || September 14, 2006 || Kitt Peak || Spacewatch || BRA || align=right | 1.7 km || 
|-id=462 bgcolor=#FFC2E0
| 475462 ||  || — || September 16, 2006 || Kitt Peak || Spacewatch || AMO || align=right data-sort-value="0.55" | 550 m || 
|-id=463 bgcolor=#fefefe
| 475463 ||  || — || September 16, 2006 || Anderson Mesa || LONEOS || — || align=right data-sort-value="0.70" | 700 m || 
|-id=464 bgcolor=#fefefe
| 475464 ||  || — || September 18, 2006 || Kitt Peak || Spacewatch || — || align=right data-sort-value="0.73" | 730 m || 
|-id=465 bgcolor=#fefefe
| 475465 ||  || — || September 15, 2006 || Kitt Peak || Spacewatch || — || align=right data-sort-value="0.51" | 510 m || 
|-id=466 bgcolor=#d6d6d6
| 475466 ||  || — || September 19, 2006 || Kitt Peak || Spacewatch || — || align=right | 1.8 km || 
|-id=467 bgcolor=#fefefe
| 475467 ||  || — || September 18, 2006 || Kitt Peak || Spacewatch || — || align=right data-sort-value="0.67" | 670 m || 
|-id=468 bgcolor=#fefefe
| 475468 ||  || — || September 18, 2006 || Kitt Peak || Spacewatch || — || align=right data-sort-value="0.62" | 620 m || 
|-id=469 bgcolor=#d6d6d6
| 475469 ||  || — || September 18, 2006 || Kitt Peak || Spacewatch || EOS || align=right | 1.7 km || 
|-id=470 bgcolor=#fefefe
| 475470 ||  || — || September 18, 2006 || Kitt Peak || Spacewatch || — || align=right data-sort-value="0.51" | 510 m || 
|-id=471 bgcolor=#d6d6d6
| 475471 ||  || — || September 18, 2006 || Kitt Peak || Spacewatch || EOS || align=right | 1.2 km || 
|-id=472 bgcolor=#d6d6d6
| 475472 ||  || — || September 24, 2006 || Kitt Peak || Spacewatch || — || align=right | 2.8 km || 
|-id=473 bgcolor=#d6d6d6
| 475473 ||  || — || September 24, 2006 || Kitt Peak || Spacewatch || — || align=right | 1.8 km || 
|-id=474 bgcolor=#fefefe
| 475474 ||  || — || September 20, 2006 || Kitt Peak || Spacewatch || — || align=right data-sort-value="0.57" | 570 m || 
|-id=475 bgcolor=#d6d6d6
| 475475 ||  || — || September 15, 2006 || Kitt Peak || Spacewatch || — || align=right | 1.7 km || 
|-id=476 bgcolor=#d6d6d6
| 475476 ||  || — || September 24, 2006 || Kitt Peak || Spacewatch || — || align=right | 1.9 km || 
|-id=477 bgcolor=#d6d6d6
| 475477 ||  || — || June 3, 2005 || Kitt Peak || Spacewatch || — || align=right | 1.9 km || 
|-id=478 bgcolor=#fefefe
| 475478 ||  || — || August 19, 2006 || Kitt Peak || Spacewatch || — || align=right data-sort-value="0.54" | 540 m || 
|-id=479 bgcolor=#d6d6d6
| 475479 ||  || — || September 25, 2006 || Kitt Peak || Spacewatch || EOS || align=right | 1.4 km || 
|-id=480 bgcolor=#fefefe
| 475480 ||  || — || September 25, 2006 || Mount Lemmon || Mount Lemmon Survey || — || align=right data-sort-value="0.54" | 540 m || 
|-id=481 bgcolor=#d6d6d6
| 475481 ||  || — || September 25, 2006 || Mount Lemmon || Mount Lemmon Survey || EOS || align=right | 1.3 km || 
|-id=482 bgcolor=#d6d6d6
| 475482 ||  || — || September 16, 2006 || Kitt Peak || Spacewatch || — || align=right | 1.7 km || 
|-id=483 bgcolor=#fefefe
| 475483 ||  || — || September 26, 2006 || Mount Lemmon || Mount Lemmon Survey || — || align=right data-sort-value="0.65" | 650 m || 
|-id=484 bgcolor=#FA8072
| 475484 ||  || — || August 28, 2006 || Catalina || CSS || — || align=right data-sort-value="0.69" | 690 m || 
|-id=485 bgcolor=#fefefe
| 475485 ||  || — || September 18, 2006 || Kitt Peak || Spacewatch || — || align=right data-sort-value="0.49" | 490 m || 
|-id=486 bgcolor=#d6d6d6
| 475486 ||  || — || September 15, 2006 || Kitt Peak || Spacewatch || KOR || align=right | 1.3 km || 
|-id=487 bgcolor=#d6d6d6
| 475487 ||  || — || September 26, 2006 || Kitt Peak || Spacewatch || — || align=right | 2.1 km || 
|-id=488 bgcolor=#d6d6d6
| 475488 ||  || — || September 26, 2006 || Mount Lemmon || Mount Lemmon Survey || — || align=right | 1.8 km || 
|-id=489 bgcolor=#d6d6d6
| 475489 ||  || — || September 26, 2006 || Kitt Peak || Spacewatch || — || align=right | 1.5 km || 
|-id=490 bgcolor=#d6d6d6
| 475490 ||  || — || September 14, 2006 || Kitt Peak || Spacewatch || — || align=right | 2.1 km || 
|-id=491 bgcolor=#fefefe
| 475491 ||  || — || September 26, 2006 || Kitt Peak || Spacewatch || — || align=right data-sort-value="0.70" | 700 m || 
|-id=492 bgcolor=#fefefe
| 475492 ||  || — || September 26, 2006 || Kitt Peak || Spacewatch || — || align=right data-sort-value="0.72" | 720 m || 
|-id=493 bgcolor=#fefefe
| 475493 ||  || — || September 26, 2006 || Kitt Peak || Spacewatch || — || align=right data-sort-value="0.66" | 660 m || 
|-id=494 bgcolor=#fefefe
| 475494 ||  || — || September 26, 2006 || Kitt Peak || Spacewatch || — || align=right data-sort-value="0.74" | 740 m || 
|-id=495 bgcolor=#d6d6d6
| 475495 ||  || — || September 26, 2006 || Kitt Peak || Spacewatch || EOS || align=right | 1.6 km || 
|-id=496 bgcolor=#fefefe
| 475496 ||  || — || September 26, 2006 || Kitt Peak || Spacewatch || — || align=right data-sort-value="0.52" | 520 m || 
|-id=497 bgcolor=#fefefe
| 475497 ||  || — || September 27, 2006 || Mount Lemmon || Mount Lemmon Survey || — || align=right data-sort-value="0.63" | 630 m || 
|-id=498 bgcolor=#fefefe
| 475498 ||  || — || September 18, 2006 || Catalina || CSS || — || align=right data-sort-value="0.81" | 810 m || 
|-id=499 bgcolor=#d6d6d6
| 475499 ||  || — || September 25, 2006 || Kitt Peak || Spacewatch || — || align=right | 2.3 km || 
|-id=500 bgcolor=#fefefe
| 475500 ||  || — || September 26, 2006 || Kitt Peak || Spacewatch || H || align=right data-sort-value="0.51" | 510 m || 
|}

475501–475600 

|-bgcolor=#fefefe
| 475501 ||  || — || September 27, 2006 || Kitt Peak || Spacewatch || — || align=right data-sort-value="0.74" | 740 m || 
|-id=502 bgcolor=#d6d6d6
| 475502 ||  || — || September 27, 2006 || Kitt Peak || Spacewatch || EOS || align=right | 1.5 km || 
|-id=503 bgcolor=#d6d6d6
| 475503 ||  || — || September 17, 2006 || Kitt Peak || Spacewatch || — || align=right | 2.8 km || 
|-id=504 bgcolor=#fefefe
| 475504 ||  || — || September 17, 2006 || Kitt Peak || Spacewatch || H || align=right data-sort-value="0.70" | 700 m || 
|-id=505 bgcolor=#d6d6d6
| 475505 ||  || — || September 27, 2006 || Kitt Peak || Spacewatch || — || align=right | 2.4 km || 
|-id=506 bgcolor=#d6d6d6
| 475506 ||  || — || September 19, 2006 || Kitt Peak || Spacewatch || KOR || align=right | 1.1 km || 
|-id=507 bgcolor=#d6d6d6
| 475507 ||  || — || September 27, 2006 || Kitt Peak || Spacewatch || — || align=right | 2.3 km || 
|-id=508 bgcolor=#fefefe
| 475508 ||  || — || September 25, 2006 || Kitt Peak || Spacewatch || — || align=right data-sort-value="0.57" | 570 m || 
|-id=509 bgcolor=#fefefe
| 475509 ||  || — || September 28, 2006 || Kitt Peak || Spacewatch || — || align=right data-sort-value="0.64" | 640 m || 
|-id=510 bgcolor=#fefefe
| 475510 ||  || — || July 21, 2006 || Mount Lemmon || Mount Lemmon Survey || — || align=right data-sort-value="0.65" | 650 m || 
|-id=511 bgcolor=#d6d6d6
| 475511 ||  || — || September 28, 2006 || Kitt Peak || Spacewatch || — || align=right | 2.3 km || 
|-id=512 bgcolor=#d6d6d6
| 475512 ||  || — || September 18, 2006 || Kitt Peak || Spacewatch || — || align=right | 2.5 km || 
|-id=513 bgcolor=#FA8072
| 475513 ||  || — || September 30, 2006 || Mount Lemmon || Mount Lemmon Survey || critical || align=right data-sort-value="0.43" | 430 m || 
|-id=514 bgcolor=#fefefe
| 475514 ||  || — || September 30, 2006 || Catalina || CSS || — || align=right data-sort-value="0.60" | 600 m || 
|-id=515 bgcolor=#d6d6d6
| 475515 ||  || — || September 30, 2006 || Mount Lemmon || Mount Lemmon Survey || EOS || align=right | 1.5 km || 
|-id=516 bgcolor=#d6d6d6
| 475516 ||  || — || September 28, 2006 || Mount Lemmon || Mount Lemmon Survey || EOS || align=right | 1.9 km || 
|-id=517 bgcolor=#fefefe
| 475517 ||  || — || September 25, 2006 || Catalina || CSS || — || align=right data-sort-value="0.86" | 860 m || 
|-id=518 bgcolor=#fefefe
| 475518 ||  || — || September 30, 2006 || Mount Lemmon || Mount Lemmon Survey || H || align=right data-sort-value="0.52" | 520 m || 
|-id=519 bgcolor=#d6d6d6
| 475519 ||  || — || September 16, 2006 || Apache Point || A. C. Becker || — || align=right | 2.2 km || 
|-id=520 bgcolor=#d6d6d6
| 475520 ||  || — || September 28, 2006 || Apache Point || A. C. Becker || EOS || align=right | 1.4 km || 
|-id=521 bgcolor=#d6d6d6
| 475521 ||  || — || September 29, 2006 || Apache Point || A. C. Becker || EOS || align=right | 1.5 km || 
|-id=522 bgcolor=#d6d6d6
| 475522 ||  || — || September 17, 2006 || Kitt Peak || Spacewatch || EOS || align=right | 1.3 km || 
|-id=523 bgcolor=#d6d6d6
| 475523 ||  || — || September 17, 2006 || Kitt Peak || Spacewatch || KOR || align=right | 1.1 km || 
|-id=524 bgcolor=#d6d6d6
| 475524 ||  || — || September 17, 2006 || Kitt Peak || Spacewatch || — || align=right | 2.1 km || 
|-id=525 bgcolor=#fefefe
| 475525 ||  || — || September 25, 2006 || Kitt Peak || Spacewatch || — || align=right data-sort-value="0.57" | 570 m || 
|-id=526 bgcolor=#d6d6d6
| 475526 ||  || — || September 30, 2006 || Mount Lemmon || Mount Lemmon Survey || — || align=right | 2.4 km || 
|-id=527 bgcolor=#fefefe
| 475527 ||  || — || September 17, 2006 || Kitt Peak || Spacewatch || — || align=right data-sort-value="0.61" | 610 m || 
|-id=528 bgcolor=#d6d6d6
| 475528 ||  || — || September 17, 2006 || Kitt Peak || Spacewatch || — || align=right | 2.2 km || 
|-id=529 bgcolor=#d6d6d6
| 475529 ||  || — || September 27, 2006 || Mount Lemmon || Mount Lemmon Survey || — || align=right | 2.7 km || 
|-id=530 bgcolor=#fefefe
| 475530 ||  || — || September 18, 2006 || Catalina || CSS || — || align=right data-sort-value="0.67" | 670 m || 
|-id=531 bgcolor=#d6d6d6
| 475531 ||  || — || September 25, 2006 || Kitt Peak || Spacewatch || TEL || align=right | 1.0 km || 
|-id=532 bgcolor=#d6d6d6
| 475532 ||  || — || September 25, 2006 || Mount Lemmon || Mount Lemmon Survey || — || align=right | 2.0 km || 
|-id=533 bgcolor=#d6d6d6
| 475533 ||  || — || September 27, 2006 || Mount Lemmon || Mount Lemmon Survey || EOS || align=right | 1.5 km || 
|-id=534 bgcolor=#FFC2E0
| 475534 ||  || — || October 11, 2006 || Palomar || NEAT || ATEPHA || align=right data-sort-value="0.20" | 200 m || 
|-id=535 bgcolor=#d6d6d6
| 475535 ||  || — || September 19, 2006 || Catalina || CSS || — || align=right | 2.3 km || 
|-id=536 bgcolor=#d6d6d6
| 475536 ||  || — || September 25, 2006 || Kitt Peak || Spacewatch || — || align=right | 5.2 km || 
|-id=537 bgcolor=#d6d6d6
| 475537 ||  || — || October 11, 2006 || Kitt Peak || Spacewatch || — || align=right | 2.2 km || 
|-id=538 bgcolor=#fefefe
| 475538 ||  || — || October 11, 2006 || Kitt Peak || Spacewatch || — || align=right data-sort-value="0.72" | 720 m || 
|-id=539 bgcolor=#d6d6d6
| 475539 ||  || — || October 11, 2006 || Kitt Peak || Spacewatch || — || align=right | 2.2 km || 
|-id=540 bgcolor=#d6d6d6
| 475540 ||  || — || October 2, 2006 || Mount Lemmon || Mount Lemmon Survey || — || align=right | 2.5 km || 
|-id=541 bgcolor=#fefefe
| 475541 ||  || — || September 28, 2006 || Mount Lemmon || Mount Lemmon Survey || — || align=right data-sort-value="0.66" | 660 m || 
|-id=542 bgcolor=#d6d6d6
| 475542 ||  || — || October 12, 2006 || Kitt Peak || Spacewatch || — || align=right | 2.0 km || 
|-id=543 bgcolor=#d6d6d6
| 475543 ||  || — || September 30, 2006 || Mount Lemmon || Mount Lemmon Survey || — || align=right | 2.2 km || 
|-id=544 bgcolor=#d6d6d6
| 475544 ||  || — || September 30, 2006 || Mount Lemmon || Mount Lemmon Survey || EOS || align=right | 1.8 km || 
|-id=545 bgcolor=#fefefe
| 475545 ||  || — || October 12, 2006 || Kitt Peak || Spacewatch || — || align=right data-sort-value="0.73" | 730 m || 
|-id=546 bgcolor=#d6d6d6
| 475546 ||  || — || October 12, 2006 || Kitt Peak || Spacewatch || — || align=right | 1.9 km || 
|-id=547 bgcolor=#fefefe
| 475547 ||  || — || October 12, 2006 || Kitt Peak || Spacewatch || — || align=right data-sort-value="0.87" | 870 m || 
|-id=548 bgcolor=#d6d6d6
| 475548 ||  || — || October 12, 2006 || Kitt Peak || Spacewatch || — || align=right | 2.0 km || 
|-id=549 bgcolor=#fefefe
| 475549 ||  || — || October 13, 2006 || Kitt Peak || Spacewatch || — || align=right data-sort-value="0.90" | 900 m || 
|-id=550 bgcolor=#d6d6d6
| 475550 ||  || — || September 30, 2006 || Mount Lemmon || Mount Lemmon Survey || — || align=right | 2.2 km || 
|-id=551 bgcolor=#d6d6d6
| 475551 ||  || — || October 11, 2006 || Palomar || NEAT || — || align=right | 2.4 km || 
|-id=552 bgcolor=#fefefe
| 475552 ||  || — || October 3, 2006 || Kitt Peak || Spacewatch || — || align=right data-sort-value="0.65" | 650 m || 
|-id=553 bgcolor=#fefefe
| 475553 ||  || — || September 30, 2006 || Mount Lemmon || Mount Lemmon Survey || H || align=right data-sort-value="0.59" | 590 m || 
|-id=554 bgcolor=#d6d6d6
| 475554 ||  || — || October 13, 2006 || Kitt Peak || Spacewatch || EOS || align=right | 1.9 km || 
|-id=555 bgcolor=#fefefe
| 475555 ||  || — || October 2, 2006 || Mount Lemmon || Mount Lemmon Survey || — || align=right data-sort-value="0.59" | 590 m || 
|-id=556 bgcolor=#d6d6d6
| 475556 ||  || — || October 4, 2006 || Mount Lemmon || Mount Lemmon Survey || — || align=right | 3.0 km || 
|-id=557 bgcolor=#d6d6d6
| 475557 ||  || — || October 4, 2006 || Mount Lemmon || Mount Lemmon Survey || — || align=right | 2.3 km || 
|-id=558 bgcolor=#d6d6d6
| 475558 ||  || — || October 13, 2006 || Kitt Peak || Spacewatch || — || align=right | 2.6 km || 
|-id=559 bgcolor=#d6d6d6
| 475559 ||  || — || October 13, 2006 || Kitt Peak || Spacewatch || — || align=right | 2.3 km || 
|-id=560 bgcolor=#d6d6d6
| 475560 ||  || — || October 2, 2006 || Mount Lemmon || Mount Lemmon Survey || — || align=right | 2.7 km || 
|-id=561 bgcolor=#FA8072
| 475561 ||  || — || October 12, 2006 || Palomar || NEAT || — || align=right data-sort-value="0.91" | 910 m || 
|-id=562 bgcolor=#fefefe
| 475562 ||  || — || October 2, 2006 || Mount Lemmon || Mount Lemmon Survey || — || align=right data-sort-value="0.63" | 630 m || 
|-id=563 bgcolor=#d6d6d6
| 475563 ||  || — || September 27, 2006 || Mount Lemmon || Mount Lemmon Survey || — || align=right | 2.4 km || 
|-id=564 bgcolor=#d6d6d6
| 475564 ||  || — || October 1, 2006 || Apache Point || A. C. Becker || — || align=right | 1.9 km || 
|-id=565 bgcolor=#d6d6d6
| 475565 ||  || — || October 12, 2006 || Kitt Peak || Spacewatch || — || align=right | 1.7 km || 
|-id=566 bgcolor=#fefefe
| 475566 ||  || — || October 2, 2006 || Mount Lemmon || Mount Lemmon Survey || — || align=right data-sort-value="0.57" | 570 m || 
|-id=567 bgcolor=#d6d6d6
| 475567 ||  || — || October 13, 2006 || Kitt Peak || Spacewatch || — || align=right | 1.9 km || 
|-id=568 bgcolor=#d6d6d6
| 475568 ||  || — || October 2, 2006 || Mount Lemmon || Mount Lemmon Survey || — || align=right | 1.9 km || 
|-id=569 bgcolor=#fefefe
| 475569 ||  || — || October 3, 2006 || Mount Lemmon || Mount Lemmon Survey || — || align=right data-sort-value="0.67" | 670 m || 
|-id=570 bgcolor=#fefefe
| 475570 ||  || — || October 11, 2006 || Kitt Peak || Spacewatch || — || align=right data-sort-value="0.60" | 600 m || 
|-id=571 bgcolor=#d6d6d6
| 475571 ||  || — || September 17, 2006 || Kitt Peak || Spacewatch || — || align=right | 1.8 km || 
|-id=572 bgcolor=#fefefe
| 475572 ||  || — || September 16, 2006 || Catalina || CSS || — || align=right data-sort-value="0.76" | 760 m || 
|-id=573 bgcolor=#fefefe
| 475573 ||  || — || October 16, 2006 || Kitt Peak || Spacewatch || — || align=right data-sort-value="0.63" | 630 m || 
|-id=574 bgcolor=#fefefe
| 475574 ||  || — || October 17, 2006 || Mount Lemmon || Mount Lemmon Survey || — || align=right data-sort-value="0.89" | 890 m || 
|-id=575 bgcolor=#fefefe
| 475575 ||  || — || October 17, 2006 || Mount Lemmon || Mount Lemmon Survey || — || align=right data-sort-value="0.56" | 560 m || 
|-id=576 bgcolor=#d6d6d6
| 475576 ||  || — || October 16, 2006 || Kitt Peak || Spacewatch || — || align=right | 1.9 km || 
|-id=577 bgcolor=#fefefe
| 475577 ||  || — || October 16, 2006 || Kitt Peak || Spacewatch || — || align=right data-sort-value="0.57" | 570 m || 
|-id=578 bgcolor=#d6d6d6
| 475578 ||  || — || September 26, 2006 || Mount Lemmon || Mount Lemmon Survey || — || align=right | 2.1 km || 
|-id=579 bgcolor=#d6d6d6
| 475579 ||  || — || October 16, 2006 || Kitt Peak || Spacewatch || KOR || align=right | 1.3 km || 
|-id=580 bgcolor=#d6d6d6
| 475580 ||  || — || September 27, 2006 || Mount Lemmon || Mount Lemmon Survey || critical || align=right | 1.9 km || 
|-id=581 bgcolor=#fefefe
| 475581 ||  || — || September 27, 2006 || Mount Lemmon || Mount Lemmon Survey || — || align=right data-sort-value="0.68" | 680 m || 
|-id=582 bgcolor=#fefefe
| 475582 ||  || — || September 26, 2006 || Mount Lemmon || Mount Lemmon Survey || — || align=right data-sort-value="0.59" | 590 m || 
|-id=583 bgcolor=#d6d6d6
| 475583 ||  || — || October 16, 2006 || Kitt Peak || Spacewatch || KOR || align=right | 1.2 km || 
|-id=584 bgcolor=#d6d6d6
| 475584 ||  || — || October 16, 2006 || Kitt Peak || Spacewatch || — || align=right | 2.3 km || 
|-id=585 bgcolor=#d6d6d6
| 475585 ||  || — || September 28, 2006 || Mount Lemmon || Mount Lemmon Survey || EOS || align=right | 1.5 km || 
|-id=586 bgcolor=#d6d6d6
| 475586 ||  || — || October 16, 2006 || Kitt Peak || Spacewatch || — || align=right | 2.0 km || 
|-id=587 bgcolor=#d6d6d6
| 475587 ||  || — || October 16, 2006 || Kitt Peak || Spacewatch || — || align=right | 2.1 km || 
|-id=588 bgcolor=#d6d6d6
| 475588 ||  || — || October 16, 2006 || Kitt Peak || Spacewatch || KOR || align=right | 1.2 km || 
|-id=589 bgcolor=#fefefe
| 475589 ||  || — || September 30, 2006 || Mount Lemmon || Mount Lemmon Survey || — || align=right data-sort-value="0.72" | 720 m || 
|-id=590 bgcolor=#d6d6d6
| 475590 ||  || — || September 28, 2006 || Mount Lemmon || Mount Lemmon Survey || — || align=right | 2.6 km || 
|-id=591 bgcolor=#fefefe
| 475591 ||  || — || October 17, 2006 || Kitt Peak || Spacewatch || — || align=right data-sort-value="0.70" | 700 m || 
|-id=592 bgcolor=#fefefe
| 475592 ||  || — || October 4, 2006 || Mount Lemmon || Mount Lemmon Survey || — || align=right data-sort-value="0.73" | 730 m || 
|-id=593 bgcolor=#d6d6d6
| 475593 ||  || — || October 13, 2006 || Kitt Peak || Spacewatch || — || align=right | 2.2 km || 
|-id=594 bgcolor=#fefefe
| 475594 ||  || — || September 30, 2006 || Kitt Peak || Spacewatch || — || align=right data-sort-value="0.75" | 750 m || 
|-id=595 bgcolor=#d6d6d6
| 475595 ||  || — || October 17, 2006 || Kitt Peak || Spacewatch || — || align=right | 2.4 km || 
|-id=596 bgcolor=#d6d6d6
| 475596 ||  || — || September 19, 2006 || Kitt Peak || Spacewatch || — || align=right | 1.7 km || 
|-id=597 bgcolor=#fefefe
| 475597 ||  || — || October 2, 2006 || Mount Lemmon || Mount Lemmon Survey || — || align=right data-sort-value="0.72" | 720 m || 
|-id=598 bgcolor=#d6d6d6
| 475598 ||  || — || September 28, 2006 || Mount Lemmon || Mount Lemmon Survey || — || align=right | 2.4 km || 
|-id=599 bgcolor=#d6d6d6
| 475599 ||  || — || October 17, 2006 || Mount Lemmon || Mount Lemmon Survey || — || align=right | 2.3 km || 
|-id=600 bgcolor=#d6d6d6
| 475600 ||  || — || September 27, 2006 || Mount Lemmon || Mount Lemmon Survey || — || align=right | 2.5 km || 
|}

475601–475700 

|-bgcolor=#fefefe
| 475601 ||  || — || September 27, 2006 || Mount Lemmon || Mount Lemmon Survey || (2076) || align=right data-sort-value="0.74" | 740 m || 
|-id=602 bgcolor=#fefefe
| 475602 ||  || — || October 18, 2006 || Kitt Peak || Spacewatch || — || align=right data-sort-value="0.78" | 780 m || 
|-id=603 bgcolor=#d6d6d6
| 475603 ||  || — || September 18, 2006 || Kitt Peak || Spacewatch || — || align=right | 2.1 km || 
|-id=604 bgcolor=#d6d6d6
| 475604 ||  || — || October 2, 2006 || Mount Lemmon || Mount Lemmon Survey || — || align=right | 2.0 km || 
|-id=605 bgcolor=#fefefe
| 475605 ||  || — || October 19, 2006 || Kitt Peak || Spacewatch || — || align=right data-sort-value="0.62" | 620 m || 
|-id=606 bgcolor=#d6d6d6
| 475606 ||  || — || October 19, 2006 || Kitt Peak || Spacewatch || — || align=right | 1.8 km || 
|-id=607 bgcolor=#d6d6d6
| 475607 ||  || — || October 19, 2006 || Kitt Peak || Spacewatch || — || align=right | 2.3 km || 
|-id=608 bgcolor=#d6d6d6
| 475608 ||  || — || September 30, 2006 || Mount Lemmon || Mount Lemmon Survey || — || align=right | 2.2 km || 
|-id=609 bgcolor=#d6d6d6
| 475609 ||  || — || October 4, 2006 || Mount Lemmon || Mount Lemmon Survey || EOS || align=right | 1.5 km || 
|-id=610 bgcolor=#d6d6d6
| 475610 ||  || — || October 19, 2006 || Kitt Peak || Spacewatch || TRE || align=right | 2.1 km || 
|-id=611 bgcolor=#fefefe
| 475611 ||  || — || October 19, 2006 || Kitt Peak || Spacewatch || — || align=right data-sort-value="0.77" | 770 m || 
|-id=612 bgcolor=#d6d6d6
| 475612 ||  || — || October 19, 2006 || Kitt Peak || Spacewatch || — || align=right | 3.3 km || 
|-id=613 bgcolor=#d6d6d6
| 475613 ||  || — || September 28, 2006 || Mount Lemmon || Mount Lemmon Survey || — || align=right | 1.8 km || 
|-id=614 bgcolor=#d6d6d6
| 475614 ||  || — || October 2, 2006 || Mount Lemmon || Mount Lemmon Survey || — || align=right | 2.0 km || 
|-id=615 bgcolor=#fefefe
| 475615 ||  || — || October 21, 2006 || Mount Lemmon || Mount Lemmon Survey || — || align=right data-sort-value="0.78" | 780 m || 
|-id=616 bgcolor=#d6d6d6
| 475616 ||  || — || October 2, 2006 || Mount Lemmon || Mount Lemmon Survey || — || align=right | 2.6 km || 
|-id=617 bgcolor=#d6d6d6
| 475617 ||  || — || October 21, 2006 || Mount Lemmon || Mount Lemmon Survey || — || align=right | 1.9 km || 
|-id=618 bgcolor=#d6d6d6
| 475618 ||  || — || October 21, 2006 || Mount Lemmon || Mount Lemmon Survey || EOS || align=right | 2.0 km || 
|-id=619 bgcolor=#d6d6d6
| 475619 ||  || — || October 21, 2006 || Mount Lemmon || Mount Lemmon Survey || KOR || align=right | 1.3 km || 
|-id=620 bgcolor=#d6d6d6
| 475620 ||  || — || October 21, 2006 || Mount Lemmon || Mount Lemmon Survey || — || align=right | 1.9 km || 
|-id=621 bgcolor=#d6d6d6
| 475621 ||  || — || October 22, 2006 || Mount Lemmon || Mount Lemmon Survey || — || align=right | 2.1 km || 
|-id=622 bgcolor=#fefefe
| 475622 ||  || — || October 16, 2006 || Catalina || CSS || — || align=right data-sort-value="0.68" | 680 m || 
|-id=623 bgcolor=#d6d6d6
| 475623 ||  || — || September 17, 2006 || Anderson Mesa || LONEOS || BRA || align=right | 1.6 km || 
|-id=624 bgcolor=#d6d6d6
| 475624 ||  || — || October 2, 2006 || Mount Lemmon || Mount Lemmon Survey || — || align=right | 3.2 km || 
|-id=625 bgcolor=#fefefe
| 475625 ||  || — || September 27, 2006 || Mount Lemmon || Mount Lemmon Survey || — || align=right data-sort-value="0.79" | 790 m || 
|-id=626 bgcolor=#fefefe
| 475626 ||  || — || October 20, 2006 || Kitt Peak || Spacewatch || — || align=right data-sort-value="0.65" | 650 m || 
|-id=627 bgcolor=#fefefe
| 475627 ||  || — || October 21, 2006 || Mount Lemmon || Mount Lemmon Survey || H || align=right data-sort-value="0.51" | 510 m || 
|-id=628 bgcolor=#d6d6d6
| 475628 ||  || — || September 30, 2006 || Mount Lemmon || Mount Lemmon Survey || — || align=right | 2.2 km || 
|-id=629 bgcolor=#fefefe
| 475629 ||  || — || October 28, 2006 || Calvin-Rehoboth || L. A. Molnar || — || align=right data-sort-value="0.65" | 650 m || 
|-id=630 bgcolor=#d6d6d6
| 475630 ||  || — || October 16, 2006 || Kitt Peak || Spacewatch || — || align=right | 3.7 km || 
|-id=631 bgcolor=#d6d6d6
| 475631 ||  || — || September 17, 2006 || Catalina || CSS || — || align=right | 4.1 km || 
|-id=632 bgcolor=#d6d6d6
| 475632 ||  || — || October 23, 2006 || Kitt Peak || Spacewatch || — || align=right | 1.8 km || 
|-id=633 bgcolor=#d6d6d6
| 475633 ||  || — || October 23, 2006 || Kitt Peak || Spacewatch || — || align=right | 2.1 km || 
|-id=634 bgcolor=#d6d6d6
| 475634 ||  || — || September 28, 2006 || Mount Lemmon || Mount Lemmon Survey || — || align=right | 3.1 km || 
|-id=635 bgcolor=#d6d6d6
| 475635 ||  || — || September 28, 2006 || Mount Lemmon || Mount Lemmon Survey || — || align=right | 2.7 km || 
|-id=636 bgcolor=#d6d6d6
| 475636 ||  || — || October 23, 2006 || Kitt Peak || Spacewatch || — || align=right | 2.2 km || 
|-id=637 bgcolor=#d6d6d6
| 475637 ||  || — || October 27, 2006 || Kitt Peak || Spacewatch || EOS || align=right | 1.5 km || 
|-id=638 bgcolor=#d6d6d6
| 475638 ||  || — || October 16, 2006 || Kitt Peak || Spacewatch || — || align=right | 1.9 km || 
|-id=639 bgcolor=#d6d6d6
| 475639 ||  || — || October 16, 2006 || Kitt Peak || Spacewatch || — || align=right | 2.1 km || 
|-id=640 bgcolor=#d6d6d6
| 475640 ||  || — || October 16, 2006 || Kitt Peak || Spacewatch || EOS || align=right | 1.6 km || 
|-id=641 bgcolor=#d6d6d6
| 475641 ||  || — || October 27, 2006 || Mount Lemmon || Mount Lemmon Survey || — || align=right | 2.2 km || 
|-id=642 bgcolor=#d6d6d6
| 475642 ||  || — || October 20, 2006 || Kitt Peak || Spacewatch || — || align=right | 2.5 km || 
|-id=643 bgcolor=#d6d6d6
| 475643 ||  || — || October 27, 2006 || Kitt Peak || Spacewatch || — || align=right | 2.0 km || 
|-id=644 bgcolor=#fefefe
| 475644 ||  || — || October 27, 2006 || Kitt Peak || Spacewatch || — || align=right data-sort-value="0.62" | 620 m || 
|-id=645 bgcolor=#fefefe
| 475645 ||  || — || September 30, 2006 || Mount Lemmon || Mount Lemmon Survey || — || align=right data-sort-value="0.56" | 560 m || 
|-id=646 bgcolor=#d6d6d6
| 475646 ||  || — || October 27, 2006 || Kitt Peak || Spacewatch || — || align=right | 4.2 km || 
|-id=647 bgcolor=#d6d6d6
| 475647 ||  || — || October 19, 2006 || Kitt Peak || Spacewatch || — || align=right | 3.1 km || 
|-id=648 bgcolor=#d6d6d6
| 475648 ||  || — || September 27, 2006 || Mount Lemmon || Mount Lemmon Survey || EOS || align=right | 1.6 km || 
|-id=649 bgcolor=#fefefe
| 475649 ||  || — || October 20, 2006 || Kitt Peak || Spacewatch || — || align=right data-sort-value="0.53" | 530 m || 
|-id=650 bgcolor=#fefefe
| 475650 ||  || — || October 16, 2006 || Kitt Peak || Spacewatch || — || align=right data-sort-value="0.64" | 640 m || 
|-id=651 bgcolor=#d6d6d6
| 475651 ||  || — || October 12, 2006 || Kitt Peak || Spacewatch || KOR || align=right | 1.2 km || 
|-id=652 bgcolor=#d6d6d6
| 475652 ||  || — || October 4, 2006 || Mount Lemmon || Mount Lemmon Survey || — || align=right | 2.3 km || 
|-id=653 bgcolor=#d6d6d6
| 475653 ||  || — || October 13, 2006 || Kitt Peak || Spacewatch || — || align=right | 1.9 km || 
|-id=654 bgcolor=#d6d6d6
| 475654 ||  || — || October 19, 2006 || Mount Lemmon || Mount Lemmon Survey || — || align=right | 2.4 km || 
|-id=655 bgcolor=#d6d6d6
| 475655 ||  || — || October 28, 2006 || Mount Lemmon || Mount Lemmon Survey || — || align=right | 2.4 km || 
|-id=656 bgcolor=#d6d6d6
| 475656 ||  || — || October 20, 2006 || Kitt Peak || Spacewatch || — || align=right | 2.4 km || 
|-id=657 bgcolor=#fefefe
| 475657 ||  || — || September 30, 2006 || Mount Lemmon || Mount Lemmon Survey || — || align=right data-sort-value="0.62" | 620 m || 
|-id=658 bgcolor=#d6d6d6
| 475658 ||  || — || September 27, 2006 || Mount Lemmon || Mount Lemmon Survey || KOR || align=right | 1.1 km || 
|-id=659 bgcolor=#d6d6d6
| 475659 ||  || — || October 27, 2006 || Mount Lemmon || Mount Lemmon Survey || EOS || align=right | 1.8 km || 
|-id=660 bgcolor=#fefefe
| 475660 ||  || — || September 30, 2006 || Mount Lemmon || Mount Lemmon Survey || (2076) || align=right data-sort-value="0.71" | 710 m || 
|-id=661 bgcolor=#d6d6d6
| 475661 ||  || — || October 3, 2006 || Mount Lemmon || Mount Lemmon Survey || — || align=right | 2.3 km || 
|-id=662 bgcolor=#d6d6d6
| 475662 ||  || — || October 13, 2006 || Kitt Peak || Spacewatch || — || align=right | 2.6 km || 
|-id=663 bgcolor=#d6d6d6
| 475663 ||  || — || October 12, 2006 || Kitt Peak || Spacewatch || — || align=right | 2.4 km || 
|-id=664 bgcolor=#fefefe
| 475664 ||  || — || November 11, 2006 || Mount Lemmon || Mount Lemmon Survey || — || align=right data-sort-value="0.66" | 660 m || 
|-id=665 bgcolor=#FFC2E0
| 475665 ||  || — || November 11, 2006 || Mount Lemmon || Mount Lemmon Survey || AMO +1km || align=right | 1.3 km || 
|-id=666 bgcolor=#d6d6d6
| 475666 ||  || — || November 9, 2006 || Kitt Peak || Spacewatch || — || align=right | 2.6 km || 
|-id=667 bgcolor=#d6d6d6
| 475667 ||  || — || October 31, 2006 || Mount Lemmon || Mount Lemmon Survey || — || align=right | 2.2 km || 
|-id=668 bgcolor=#fefefe
| 475668 ||  || — || October 13, 2006 || Kitt Peak || Spacewatch || — || align=right data-sort-value="0.62" | 620 m || 
|-id=669 bgcolor=#d6d6d6
| 475669 ||  || — || September 27, 2006 || Mount Lemmon || Mount Lemmon Survey || — || align=right | 2.3 km || 
|-id=670 bgcolor=#d6d6d6
| 475670 ||  || — || October 21, 2006 || Kitt Peak || Spacewatch || EOS || align=right | 1.8 km || 
|-id=671 bgcolor=#d6d6d6
| 475671 ||  || — || November 10, 2006 || Kitt Peak || Spacewatch || EOS || align=right | 1.5 km || 
|-id=672 bgcolor=#d6d6d6
| 475672 ||  || — || October 28, 2006 || Mount Lemmon || Mount Lemmon Survey || — || align=right | 2.5 km || 
|-id=673 bgcolor=#d6d6d6
| 475673 ||  || — || October 3, 2006 || Mount Lemmon || Mount Lemmon Survey || — || align=right | 3.1 km || 
|-id=674 bgcolor=#d6d6d6
| 475674 ||  || — || October 13, 2006 || Kitt Peak || Spacewatch || — || align=right | 1.7 km || 
|-id=675 bgcolor=#fefefe
| 475675 ||  || — || October 31, 2006 || Mount Lemmon || Mount Lemmon Survey || — || align=right data-sort-value="0.55" | 550 m || 
|-id=676 bgcolor=#fefefe
| 475676 ||  || — || November 11, 2006 || Kitt Peak || Spacewatch || — || align=right data-sort-value="0.61" | 610 m || 
|-id=677 bgcolor=#d6d6d6
| 475677 ||  || — || October 23, 2006 || Mount Lemmon || Mount Lemmon Survey || — || align=right | 2.0 km || 
|-id=678 bgcolor=#fefefe
| 475678 ||  || — || October 22, 2006 || Mount Lemmon || Mount Lemmon Survey || — || align=right data-sort-value="0.88" | 880 m || 
|-id=679 bgcolor=#d6d6d6
| 475679 ||  || — || November 11, 2006 || Kitt Peak || Spacewatch || — || align=right | 2.2 km || 
|-id=680 bgcolor=#fefefe
| 475680 ||  || — || November 11, 2006 || Kitt Peak || Spacewatch || — || align=right data-sort-value="0.68" | 680 m || 
|-id=681 bgcolor=#d6d6d6
| 475681 ||  || — || November 11, 2006 || Kitt Peak || Spacewatch || — || align=right | 2.1 km || 
|-id=682 bgcolor=#fefefe
| 475682 ||  || — || September 28, 2006 || Mount Lemmon || Mount Lemmon Survey || — || align=right data-sort-value="0.63" | 630 m || 
|-id=683 bgcolor=#fefefe
| 475683 ||  || — || November 12, 2006 || Mount Lemmon || Mount Lemmon Survey || — || align=right data-sort-value="0.76" | 760 m || 
|-id=684 bgcolor=#fefefe
| 475684 ||  || — || November 12, 2006 || Mount Lemmon || Mount Lemmon Survey || — || align=right data-sort-value="0.66" | 660 m || 
|-id=685 bgcolor=#d6d6d6
| 475685 ||  || — || October 31, 2006 || Mount Lemmon || Mount Lemmon Survey || — || align=right | 3.4 km || 
|-id=686 bgcolor=#d6d6d6
| 475686 ||  || — || October 19, 2006 || Mount Lemmon || Mount Lemmon Survey || — || align=right | 2.7 km || 
|-id=687 bgcolor=#fefefe
| 475687 ||  || — || October 19, 2006 || Kitt Peak || Spacewatch || — || align=right data-sort-value="0.64" | 640 m || 
|-id=688 bgcolor=#d6d6d6
| 475688 ||  || — || November 15, 2006 || Mount Lemmon || Mount Lemmon Survey || — || align=right | 2.5 km || 
|-id=689 bgcolor=#d6d6d6
| 475689 ||  || — || October 22, 2006 || Kitt Peak || Spacewatch || — || align=right | 3.2 km || 
|-id=690 bgcolor=#fefefe
| 475690 ||  || — || October 3, 2006 || Kitt Peak || Spacewatch || — || align=right data-sort-value="0.57" | 570 m || 
|-id=691 bgcolor=#fefefe
| 475691 ||  || — || October 22, 2006 || Mount Lemmon || Mount Lemmon Survey || — || align=right data-sort-value="0.79" | 790 m || 
|-id=692 bgcolor=#d6d6d6
| 475692 ||  || — || September 27, 2006 || Mount Lemmon || Mount Lemmon Survey || — || align=right | 3.2 km || 
|-id=693 bgcolor=#d6d6d6
| 475693 ||  || — || November 13, 2006 || Kitt Peak || Spacewatch || EOS || align=right | 1.5 km || 
|-id=694 bgcolor=#fefefe
| 475694 ||  || — || November 13, 2006 || Kitt Peak || Spacewatch || — || align=right data-sort-value="0.63" | 630 m || 
|-id=695 bgcolor=#d6d6d6
| 475695 ||  || — || November 13, 2006 || Palomar || NEAT || — || align=right | 2.2 km || 
|-id=696 bgcolor=#fefefe
| 475696 ||  || — || November 13, 2006 || San Marcello || Pistoia Mountains Obs. || — || align=right data-sort-value="0.77" | 770 m || 
|-id=697 bgcolor=#fefefe
| 475697 ||  || — || October 19, 2006 || Mount Lemmon || Mount Lemmon Survey || — || align=right data-sort-value="0.57" | 570 m || 
|-id=698 bgcolor=#d6d6d6
| 475698 ||  || — || September 28, 2006 || Mount Lemmon || Mount Lemmon Survey || — || align=right | 2.6 km || 
|-id=699 bgcolor=#fefefe
| 475699 ||  || — || November 14, 2006 || Kitt Peak || Spacewatch || — || align=right data-sort-value="0.61" | 610 m || 
|-id=700 bgcolor=#d6d6d6
| 475700 ||  || — || October 27, 2006 || Mount Lemmon || Mount Lemmon Survey || — || align=right | 2.6 km || 
|}

475701–475800 

|-bgcolor=#d6d6d6
| 475701 ||  || — || November 14, 2006 || Kitt Peak || Spacewatch || EOS || align=right | 1.2 km || 
|-id=702 bgcolor=#d6d6d6
| 475702 ||  || — || November 14, 2006 || Kitt Peak || Spacewatch || — || align=right | 2.7 km || 
|-id=703 bgcolor=#fefefe
| 475703 ||  || — || November 15, 2006 || Kitt Peak || Spacewatch || — || align=right data-sort-value="0.65" | 650 m || 
|-id=704 bgcolor=#fefefe
| 475704 ||  || — || November 15, 2006 || Kitt Peak || Spacewatch || — || align=right data-sort-value="0.57" | 570 m || 
|-id=705 bgcolor=#d6d6d6
| 475705 ||  || — || October 20, 2006 || Mount Lemmon || Mount Lemmon Survey || — || align=right | 2.6 km || 
|-id=706 bgcolor=#d6d6d6
| 475706 ||  || — || November 15, 2006 || Kitt Peak || Spacewatch || — || align=right | 2.6 km || 
|-id=707 bgcolor=#d6d6d6
| 475707 ||  || — || November 10, 1996 || Kitt Peak || Spacewatch || — || align=right data-sort-value="0.70" | 700 m || 
|-id=708 bgcolor=#d6d6d6
| 475708 ||  || — || November 9, 2006 || Apache Point || A. E. Rose, A. C. Becker || KOR || align=right data-sort-value="0.94" | 940 m || 
|-id=709 bgcolor=#fefefe
| 475709 ||  || — || November 11, 2006 || Mount Lemmon || Mount Lemmon Survey || — || align=right data-sort-value="0.91" | 910 m || 
|-id=710 bgcolor=#fefefe
| 475710 ||  || — || November 14, 2006 || Mount Lemmon || Mount Lemmon Survey || — || align=right data-sort-value="0.69" | 690 m || 
|-id=711 bgcolor=#fefefe
| 475711 ||  || — || November 1, 2006 || Mount Lemmon || Mount Lemmon Survey || V || align=right data-sort-value="0.54" | 540 m || 
|-id=712 bgcolor=#fefefe
| 475712 ||  || — || November 2, 2006 || Mount Lemmon || Mount Lemmon Survey || — || align=right data-sort-value="0.78" | 780 m || 
|-id=713 bgcolor=#d6d6d6
| 475713 ||  || — || November 12, 2006 || Mount Lemmon || Mount Lemmon Survey || EOS || align=right | 1.5 km || 
|-id=714 bgcolor=#fefefe
| 475714 ||  || — || September 28, 2006 || Catalina || CSS || — || align=right data-sort-value="0.81" | 810 m || 
|-id=715 bgcolor=#fefefe
| 475715 ||  || — || October 22, 2006 || Mount Lemmon || Mount Lemmon Survey || H || align=right data-sort-value="0.62" | 620 m || 
|-id=716 bgcolor=#d6d6d6
| 475716 ||  || — || September 28, 2006 || Mount Lemmon || Mount Lemmon Survey || — || align=right | 2.9 km || 
|-id=717 bgcolor=#d6d6d6
| 475717 ||  || — || October 23, 2006 || Mount Lemmon || Mount Lemmon Survey || — || align=right | 2.0 km || 
|-id=718 bgcolor=#d6d6d6
| 475718 ||  || — || September 28, 2006 || Mount Lemmon || Mount Lemmon Survey || — || align=right | 2.2 km || 
|-id=719 bgcolor=#fefefe
| 475719 ||  || — || November 16, 2006 || Socorro || LINEAR || H || align=right data-sort-value="0.73" | 730 m || 
|-id=720 bgcolor=#fefefe
| 475720 ||  || — || November 22, 2006 || Kitt Peak || Spacewatch || — || align=right data-sort-value="0.94" | 940 m || 
|-id=721 bgcolor=#fefefe
| 475721 ||  || — || September 27, 2006 || Mount Lemmon || Mount Lemmon Survey || — || align=right data-sort-value="0.60" | 600 m || 
|-id=722 bgcolor=#fefefe
| 475722 ||  || — || October 22, 2006 || Mount Lemmon || Mount Lemmon Survey || — || align=right data-sort-value="0.53" | 530 m || 
|-id=723 bgcolor=#d6d6d6
| 475723 ||  || — || October 23, 2006 || Mount Lemmon || Mount Lemmon Survey || EOS || align=right | 1.3 km || 
|-id=724 bgcolor=#d6d6d6
| 475724 ||  || — || October 23, 2006 || Mount Lemmon || Mount Lemmon Survey || — || align=right | 2.3 km || 
|-id=725 bgcolor=#d6d6d6
| 475725 ||  || — || November 16, 2006 || Kitt Peak || Spacewatch || — || align=right | 2.6 km || 
|-id=726 bgcolor=#fefefe
| 475726 ||  || — || October 4, 2006 || Mount Lemmon || Mount Lemmon Survey || — || align=right data-sort-value="0.76" | 760 m || 
|-id=727 bgcolor=#d6d6d6
| 475727 ||  || — || October 23, 2006 || Mount Lemmon || Mount Lemmon Survey || — || align=right | 2.0 km || 
|-id=728 bgcolor=#d6d6d6
| 475728 ||  || — || October 31, 2006 || Mount Lemmon || Mount Lemmon Survey || THM || align=right | 1.8 km || 
|-id=729 bgcolor=#fefefe
| 475729 ||  || — || October 23, 2006 || Mount Lemmon || Mount Lemmon Survey || — || align=right data-sort-value="0.56" | 560 m || 
|-id=730 bgcolor=#d6d6d6
| 475730 ||  || — || November 16, 2006 || Kitt Peak || Spacewatch || — || align=right | 3.1 km || 
|-id=731 bgcolor=#d6d6d6
| 475731 ||  || — || November 10, 2006 || Kitt Peak || Spacewatch || — || align=right | 1.9 km || 
|-id=732 bgcolor=#fefefe
| 475732 ||  || — || November 16, 2006 || Kitt Peak || Spacewatch || — || align=right data-sort-value="0.67" | 670 m || 
|-id=733 bgcolor=#fefefe
| 475733 ||  || — || November 17, 2006 || Mount Lemmon || Mount Lemmon Survey || — || align=right data-sort-value="0.67" | 670 m || 
|-id=734 bgcolor=#d6d6d6
| 475734 ||  || — || November 18, 2006 || Kitt Peak || Spacewatch || — || align=right | 2.0 km || 
|-id=735 bgcolor=#d6d6d6
| 475735 ||  || — || November 18, 2006 || Kitt Peak || Spacewatch || — || align=right | 2.2 km || 
|-id=736 bgcolor=#d6d6d6
| 475736 ||  || — || November 18, 2006 || Kitt Peak || Spacewatch || — || align=right | 2.5 km || 
|-id=737 bgcolor=#d6d6d6
| 475737 ||  || — || October 4, 2006 || Mount Lemmon || Mount Lemmon Survey || — || align=right | 2.1 km || 
|-id=738 bgcolor=#d6d6d6
| 475738 ||  || — || November 18, 2006 || Kitt Peak || Spacewatch || — || align=right | 2.7 km || 
|-id=739 bgcolor=#fefefe
| 475739 ||  || — || November 18, 2006 || Mount Lemmon || Mount Lemmon Survey || — || align=right data-sort-value="0.79" | 790 m || 
|-id=740 bgcolor=#d6d6d6
| 475740 ||  || — || November 18, 2006 || Kitt Peak || Spacewatch || — || align=right | 2.2 km || 
|-id=741 bgcolor=#d6d6d6
| 475741 ||  || — || October 3, 2006 || Mount Lemmon || Mount Lemmon Survey || — || align=right | 1.5 km || 
|-id=742 bgcolor=#d6d6d6
| 475742 ||  || — || September 27, 2006 || Mount Lemmon || Mount Lemmon Survey || — || align=right | 1.7 km || 
|-id=743 bgcolor=#fefefe
| 475743 ||  || — || November 19, 2006 || Kitt Peak || Spacewatch || — || align=right data-sort-value="0.61" | 610 m || 
|-id=744 bgcolor=#d6d6d6
| 475744 ||  || — || September 27, 2006 || Mount Lemmon || Mount Lemmon Survey || — || align=right | 1.9 km || 
|-id=745 bgcolor=#fefefe
| 475745 ||  || — || October 31, 2006 || Mount Lemmon || Mount Lemmon Survey || — || align=right data-sort-value="0.54" | 540 m || 
|-id=746 bgcolor=#fefefe
| 475746 ||  || — || November 19, 2006 || Kitt Peak || Spacewatch || — || align=right data-sort-value="0.51" | 510 m || 
|-id=747 bgcolor=#d6d6d6
| 475747 ||  || — || November 19, 2006 || Kitt Peak || Spacewatch || — || align=right | 2.0 km || 
|-id=748 bgcolor=#fefefe
| 475748 ||  || — || November 19, 2006 || Kitt Peak || Spacewatch || — || align=right data-sort-value="0.62" | 620 m || 
|-id=749 bgcolor=#d6d6d6
| 475749 ||  || — || November 22, 2006 || Mount Lemmon || Mount Lemmon Survey || — || align=right | 3.7 km || 
|-id=750 bgcolor=#d6d6d6
| 475750 ||  || — || November 23, 2006 || 7300 || W. K. Y. Yeung || — || align=right | 1.8 km || 
|-id=751 bgcolor=#d6d6d6
| 475751 ||  || — || November 18, 2006 || Kitt Peak || Spacewatch || — || align=right | 2.5 km || 
|-id=752 bgcolor=#d6d6d6
| 475752 ||  || — || October 13, 2006 || Kitt Peak || Spacewatch || EOS || align=right | 1.6 km || 
|-id=753 bgcolor=#fefefe
| 475753 ||  || — || November 19, 2006 || Kitt Peak || Spacewatch || — || align=right data-sort-value="0.73" | 730 m || 
|-id=754 bgcolor=#fefefe
| 475754 ||  || — || October 22, 2006 || Mount Lemmon || Mount Lemmon Survey || — || align=right data-sort-value="0.64" | 640 m || 
|-id=755 bgcolor=#d6d6d6
| 475755 ||  || — || November 15, 2006 || Catalina || CSS || — || align=right | 2.7 km || 
|-id=756 bgcolor=#d6d6d6
| 475756 ||  || — || November 21, 2006 || Mount Lemmon || Mount Lemmon Survey || — || align=right | 3.5 km || 
|-id=757 bgcolor=#d6d6d6
| 475757 ||  || — || October 23, 2006 || Mount Lemmon || Mount Lemmon Survey || — || align=right | 3.5 km || 
|-id=758 bgcolor=#d6d6d6
| 475758 ||  || — || October 15, 2006 || Kitt Peak || Spacewatch || — || align=right | 2.4 km || 
|-id=759 bgcolor=#d6d6d6
| 475759 ||  || — || November 11, 2006 || Kitt Peak || Spacewatch || — || align=right | 2.1 km || 
|-id=760 bgcolor=#fefefe
| 475760 ||  || — || October 22, 2006 || Mount Lemmon || Mount Lemmon Survey || — || align=right data-sort-value="0.52" | 520 m || 
|-id=761 bgcolor=#d6d6d6
| 475761 ||  || — || October 19, 2006 || Mount Lemmon || Mount Lemmon Survey || EOS || align=right | 2.1 km || 
|-id=762 bgcolor=#d6d6d6
| 475762 ||  || — || October 22, 2006 || Mount Lemmon || Mount Lemmon Survey || — || align=right | 2.4 km || 
|-id=763 bgcolor=#d6d6d6
| 475763 ||  || — || November 11, 2006 || Kitt Peak || Spacewatch || THM || align=right | 1.9 km || 
|-id=764 bgcolor=#d6d6d6
| 475764 ||  || — || November 23, 2006 || Kitt Peak || Spacewatch || VER || align=right | 2.6 km || 
|-id=765 bgcolor=#d6d6d6
| 475765 ||  || — || November 14, 2006 || Kitt Peak || Spacewatch || EOS || align=right | 1.8 km || 
|-id=766 bgcolor=#d6d6d6
| 475766 ||  || — || November 24, 2006 || Mount Lemmon || Mount Lemmon Survey || EOS || align=right | 1.8 km || 
|-id=767 bgcolor=#fefefe
| 475767 ||  || — || November 15, 2006 || Mount Lemmon || Mount Lemmon Survey || — || align=right data-sort-value="0.85" | 850 m || 
|-id=768 bgcolor=#d6d6d6
| 475768 ||  || — || November 11, 2006 || Kitt Peak || Spacewatch || — || align=right | 2.7 km || 
|-id=769 bgcolor=#d6d6d6
| 475769 ||  || — || November 11, 2006 || Mount Lemmon || Mount Lemmon Survey || — || align=right | 2.8 km || 
|-id=770 bgcolor=#fefefe
| 475770 ||  || — || November 11, 2006 || Kitt Peak || Spacewatch || — || align=right data-sort-value="0.67" | 670 m || 
|-id=771 bgcolor=#d6d6d6
| 475771 ||  || — || November 27, 2006 || Kitt Peak || Spacewatch || THM || align=right | 1.6 km || 
|-id=772 bgcolor=#d6d6d6
| 475772 ||  || — || November 27, 2006 || Mount Lemmon || Mount Lemmon Survey || EOS || align=right | 1.6 km || 
|-id=773 bgcolor=#d6d6d6
| 475773 ||  || — || September 27, 2006 || Mount Lemmon || Mount Lemmon Survey || — || align=right | 3.5 km || 
|-id=774 bgcolor=#fefefe
| 475774 ||  || — || November 16, 2006 || Kitt Peak || Spacewatch || — || align=right data-sort-value="0.60" | 600 m || 
|-id=775 bgcolor=#d6d6d6
| 475775 ||  || — || November 22, 2006 || Mount Lemmon || Mount Lemmon Survey || — || align=right | 3.0 km || 
|-id=776 bgcolor=#fefefe
| 475776 ||  || — || November 27, 2006 || Mount Lemmon || Mount Lemmon Survey || — || align=right data-sort-value="0.70" | 700 m || 
|-id=777 bgcolor=#d6d6d6
| 475777 ||  || — || November 16, 2006 || Kitt Peak || Spacewatch || — || align=right | 3.4 km || 
|-id=778 bgcolor=#d6d6d6
| 475778 ||  || — || November 19, 2006 || Kitt Peak || Spacewatch || — || align=right | 2.7 km || 
|-id=779 bgcolor=#fefefe
| 475779 ||  || — || November 16, 2006 || Kitt Peak || Spacewatch || V || align=right data-sort-value="0.50" | 500 m || 
|-id=780 bgcolor=#fefefe
| 475780 ||  || — || November 17, 2006 || Kitt Peak || Spacewatch || V || align=right data-sort-value="0.51" | 510 m || 
|-id=781 bgcolor=#d6d6d6
| 475781 ||  || — || December 10, 2006 || Ottmarsheim || C. Rinner || — || align=right | 2.5 km || 
|-id=782 bgcolor=#d6d6d6
| 475782 ||  || — || November 16, 2006 || Kitt Peak || Spacewatch || — || align=right | 4.2 km || 
|-id=783 bgcolor=#d6d6d6
| 475783 ||  || — || December 12, 2006 || 7300 || W. K. Y. Yeung || — || align=right | 2.6 km || 
|-id=784 bgcolor=#d6d6d6
| 475784 ||  || — || November 16, 2006 || Kitt Peak || Spacewatch || — || align=right | 3.4 km || 
|-id=785 bgcolor=#d6d6d6
| 475785 ||  || — || February 8, 2002 || Kitt Peak || Spacewatch || THM || align=right | 2.0 km || 
|-id=786 bgcolor=#fefefe
| 475786 ||  || — || December 10, 2006 || Kitt Peak || Spacewatch || V || align=right data-sort-value="0.67" | 670 m || 
|-id=787 bgcolor=#d6d6d6
| 475787 ||  || — || November 14, 2006 || Mount Lemmon || Mount Lemmon Survey || — || align=right | 2.3 km || 
|-id=788 bgcolor=#d6d6d6
| 475788 ||  || — || November 22, 2006 || Mount Lemmon || Mount Lemmon Survey || — || align=right | 3.3 km || 
|-id=789 bgcolor=#d6d6d6
| 475789 ||  || — || December 12, 2006 || Mount Lemmon || Mount Lemmon Survey || — || align=right | 3.8 km || 
|-id=790 bgcolor=#d6d6d6
| 475790 ||  || — || November 17, 2006 || Kitt Peak || Spacewatch || — || align=right | 3.5 km || 
|-id=791 bgcolor=#d6d6d6
| 475791 ||  || — || November 25, 2006 || Kitt Peak || Spacewatch || — || align=right | 2.1 km || 
|-id=792 bgcolor=#d6d6d6
| 475792 ||  || — || November 11, 2006 || Kitt Peak || Spacewatch || — || align=right | 2.6 km || 
|-id=793 bgcolor=#fefefe
| 475793 ||  || — || December 11, 2006 || Kitt Peak || Spacewatch || — || align=right data-sort-value="0.63" | 630 m || 
|-id=794 bgcolor=#d6d6d6
| 475794 ||  || — || December 11, 2006 || Kitt Peak || Spacewatch || HYG || align=right | 2.6 km || 
|-id=795 bgcolor=#d6d6d6
| 475795 ||  || — || December 1, 2006 || Mount Lemmon || Mount Lemmon Survey || — || align=right | 3.3 km || 
|-id=796 bgcolor=#d6d6d6
| 475796 ||  || — || December 11, 2006 || Kitt Peak || Spacewatch || — || align=right | 3.7 km || 
|-id=797 bgcolor=#d6d6d6
| 475797 ||  || — || December 12, 2006 || Kitt Peak || Spacewatch || — || align=right | 2.3 km || 
|-id=798 bgcolor=#d6d6d6
| 475798 ||  || — || December 15, 2006 || Kitt Peak || Spacewatch || — || align=right | 3.0 km || 
|-id=799 bgcolor=#d6d6d6
| 475799 ||  || — || November 17, 2006 || Mount Lemmon || Mount Lemmon Survey || — || align=right | 2.5 km || 
|-id=800 bgcolor=#d6d6d6
| 475800 ||  || — || December 15, 2006 || Kitt Peak || Spacewatch || — || align=right | 2.9 km || 
|}

475801–475900 

|-bgcolor=#fefefe
| 475801 ||  || — || December 15, 2006 || Kitt Peak || Spacewatch || — || align=right data-sort-value="0.60" | 600 m || 
|-id=802 bgcolor=#d6d6d6
| 475802 Zurek ||  ||  || December 13, 2006 || Mauna Kea || D. D. Balam || — || align=right | 2.5 km || 
|-id=803 bgcolor=#d6d6d6
| 475803 ||  || — || November 22, 2006 || Mount Lemmon || Mount Lemmon Survey || — || align=right | 3.4 km || 
|-id=804 bgcolor=#d6d6d6
| 475804 ||  || — || December 15, 2006 || Kitt Peak || Spacewatch || — || align=right | 1.7 km || 
|-id=805 bgcolor=#fefefe
| 475805 ||  || — || December 15, 2006 || Kitt Peak || Spacewatch || — || align=right data-sort-value="0.77" | 770 m || 
|-id=806 bgcolor=#d6d6d6
| 475806 ||  || — || September 27, 2006 || Mount Lemmon || Mount Lemmon Survey || — || align=right | 2.7 km || 
|-id=807 bgcolor=#fefefe
| 475807 ||  || — || December 16, 2006 || Kitt Peak || Spacewatch || H || align=right data-sort-value="0.62" | 620 m || 
|-id=808 bgcolor=#d6d6d6
| 475808 ||  || — || December 23, 2006 || Mount Lemmon || Mount Lemmon Survey || — || align=right | 3.3 km || 
|-id=809 bgcolor=#d6d6d6
| 475809 ||  || — || December 21, 2006 || Kitt Peak || Spacewatch || — || align=right | 2.6 km || 
|-id=810 bgcolor=#d6d6d6
| 475810 ||  || — || December 21, 2006 || Kitt Peak || Spacewatch || — || align=right | 2.4 km || 
|-id=811 bgcolor=#fefefe
| 475811 ||  || — || December 21, 2006 || Kitt Peak || Spacewatch || — || align=right data-sort-value="0.69" | 690 m || 
|-id=812 bgcolor=#fefefe
| 475812 ||  || — || December 21, 2006 || Kitt Peak || Spacewatch || — || align=right data-sort-value="0.72" | 720 m || 
|-id=813 bgcolor=#fefefe
| 475813 ||  || — || December 21, 2006 || Kitt Peak || Spacewatch || V || align=right data-sort-value="0.49" | 490 m || 
|-id=814 bgcolor=#fefefe
| 475814 ||  || — || December 24, 2006 || Mount Lemmon || Mount Lemmon Survey || — || align=right data-sort-value="0.65" | 650 m || 
|-id=815 bgcolor=#d6d6d6
| 475815 ||  || — || December 21, 2006 || Kitt Peak || Spacewatch || — || align=right | 3.0 km || 
|-id=816 bgcolor=#fefefe
| 475816 ||  || — || December 27, 2006 || Mount Lemmon || Mount Lemmon Survey || — || align=right | 1.1 km || 
|-id=817 bgcolor=#d6d6d6
| 475817 ||  || — || January 9, 2007 || Kitt Peak || Spacewatch || — || align=right | 5.8 km || 
|-id=818 bgcolor=#d6d6d6
| 475818 ||  || — || November 2, 2006 || Mount Lemmon || Mount Lemmon Survey || — || align=right | 3.6 km || 
|-id=819 bgcolor=#fefefe
| 475819 ||  || — || January 8, 2007 || Mount Lemmon || Mount Lemmon Survey || V || align=right data-sort-value="0.62" | 620 m || 
|-id=820 bgcolor=#fefefe
| 475820 ||  || — || November 21, 2006 || Socorro || LINEAR || — || align=right data-sort-value="0.75" | 750 m || 
|-id=821 bgcolor=#d6d6d6
| 475821 ||  || — || January 12, 1996 || Kitt Peak || Spacewatch || — || align=right | 3.0 km || 
|-id=822 bgcolor=#d6d6d6
| 475822 ||  || — || January 10, 2007 || Kitt Peak || Spacewatch || — || align=right | 2.6 km || 
|-id=823 bgcolor=#fefefe
| 475823 ||  || — || January 10, 2007 || Mount Lemmon || Mount Lemmon Survey || — || align=right data-sort-value="0.89" | 890 m || 
|-id=824 bgcolor=#d6d6d6
| 475824 ||  || — || January 10, 2007 || Mount Lemmon || Mount Lemmon Survey || — || align=right | 2.5 km || 
|-id=825 bgcolor=#fefefe
| 475825 ||  || — || January 10, 2007 || Mount Lemmon || Mount Lemmon Survey || H || align=right data-sort-value="0.49" | 490 m || 
|-id=826 bgcolor=#fefefe
| 475826 ||  || — || January 8, 2007 || Mount Lemmon || Mount Lemmon Survey || — || align=right data-sort-value="0.73" | 730 m || 
|-id=827 bgcolor=#d6d6d6
| 475827 ||  || — || January 16, 2007 || Socorro || LINEAR || — || align=right | 3.6 km || 
|-id=828 bgcolor=#d6d6d6
| 475828 ||  || — || December 13, 2006 || Kitt Peak || Spacewatch || — || align=right | 3.4 km || 
|-id=829 bgcolor=#d6d6d6
| 475829 ||  || — || January 16, 2007 || Catalina || CSS || EOS || align=right | 2.1 km || 
|-id=830 bgcolor=#fefefe
| 475830 ||  || — || January 8, 2007 || Kitt Peak || Spacewatch || H || align=right data-sort-value="0.79" | 790 m || 
|-id=831 bgcolor=#fefefe
| 475831 ||  || — || January 17, 2007 || Kitt Peak || Spacewatch || — || align=right | 1.00 km || 
|-id=832 bgcolor=#fefefe
| 475832 ||  || — || January 17, 2007 || Kitt Peak || Spacewatch || — || align=right data-sort-value="0.77" | 770 m || 
|-id=833 bgcolor=#d6d6d6
| 475833 ||  || — || September 28, 2000 || Kitt Peak || Spacewatch || — || align=right | 1.8 km || 
|-id=834 bgcolor=#d6d6d6
| 475834 ||  || — || January 17, 2007 || Kitt Peak || Spacewatch || THM || align=right | 2.0 km || 
|-id=835 bgcolor=#d6d6d6
| 475835 ||  || — || January 17, 2007 || Kitt Peak || Spacewatch || — || align=right | 3.1 km || 
|-id=836 bgcolor=#d6d6d6
| 475836 ||  || — || December 27, 2006 || Mount Lemmon || Mount Lemmon Survey || — || align=right | 3.6 km || 
|-id=837 bgcolor=#fefefe
| 475837 ||  || — || January 17, 2007 || Kitt Peak || Spacewatch || — || align=right data-sort-value="0.74" | 740 m || 
|-id=838 bgcolor=#d6d6d6
| 475838 ||  || — || January 24, 2007 || Mount Lemmon || Mount Lemmon Survey || — || align=right | 2.7 km || 
|-id=839 bgcolor=#fefefe
| 475839 ||  || — || January 24, 2007 || Mount Lemmon || Mount Lemmon Survey || NYS || align=right data-sort-value="0.60" | 600 m || 
|-id=840 bgcolor=#d6d6d6
| 475840 ||  || — || December 20, 2006 || Mount Lemmon || Mount Lemmon Survey || — || align=right | 3.1 km || 
|-id=841 bgcolor=#d6d6d6
| 475841 ||  || — || December 27, 2006 || Mount Lemmon || Mount Lemmon Survey || — || align=right | 2.6 km || 
|-id=842 bgcolor=#fefefe
| 475842 ||  || — || December 24, 2006 || Mount Lemmon || Mount Lemmon Survey || — || align=right data-sort-value="0.77" | 770 m || 
|-id=843 bgcolor=#fefefe
| 475843 ||  || — || January 25, 2007 || Kitt Peak || Spacewatch || — || align=right data-sort-value="0.64" | 640 m || 
|-id=844 bgcolor=#fefefe
| 475844 ||  || — || January 25, 2007 || Kitt Peak || Spacewatch || H || align=right data-sort-value="0.56" | 560 m || 
|-id=845 bgcolor=#d6d6d6
| 475845 ||  || — || January 26, 2007 || Kitt Peak || Spacewatch || — || align=right | 2.7 km || 
|-id=846 bgcolor=#fefefe
| 475846 ||  || — || January 26, 2007 || Kitt Peak || Spacewatch || — || align=right data-sort-value="0.68" | 680 m || 
|-id=847 bgcolor=#fefefe
| 475847 ||  || — || January 26, 2007 || Kitt Peak || Spacewatch || — || align=right data-sort-value="0.76" | 760 m || 
|-id=848 bgcolor=#fefefe
| 475848 ||  || — || January 17, 2007 || Kitt Peak || Spacewatch || — || align=right data-sort-value="0.67" | 670 m || 
|-id=849 bgcolor=#d6d6d6
| 475849 ||  || — || January 24, 2007 || Mount Lemmon || Mount Lemmon Survey || — || align=right | 3.4 km || 
|-id=850 bgcolor=#d6d6d6
| 475850 ||  || — || January 10, 2007 || Kitt Peak || Spacewatch || — || align=right | 3.2 km || 
|-id=851 bgcolor=#d6d6d6
| 475851 ||  || — || January 17, 2007 || Kitt Peak || Spacewatch || — || align=right | 3.3 km || 
|-id=852 bgcolor=#d6d6d6
| 475852 ||  || — || November 15, 2006 || Mount Lemmon || Mount Lemmon Survey || — || align=right | 3.4 km || 
|-id=853 bgcolor=#fefefe
| 475853 ||  || — || January 10, 2007 || Kitt Peak || Spacewatch || — || align=right data-sort-value="0.76" | 760 m || 
|-id=854 bgcolor=#d6d6d6
| 475854 ||  || — || January 26, 2007 || Kitt Peak || Spacewatch || — || align=right | 2.7 km || 
|-id=855 bgcolor=#d6d6d6
| 475855 ||  || — || January 27, 2007 || Mount Lemmon || Mount Lemmon Survey || — || align=right | 3.7 km || 
|-id=856 bgcolor=#fefefe
| 475856 ||  || — || January 27, 2007 || Mount Lemmon || Mount Lemmon Survey || — || align=right data-sort-value="0.77" | 770 m || 
|-id=857 bgcolor=#d6d6d6
| 475857 ||  || — || January 27, 2007 || Mount Lemmon || Mount Lemmon Survey || — || align=right | 2.5 km || 
|-id=858 bgcolor=#d6d6d6
| 475858 ||  || — || December 25, 2006 || Kitt Peak || Spacewatch || — || align=right | 3.2 km || 
|-id=859 bgcolor=#d6d6d6
| 475859 ||  || — || January 10, 2007 || Kitt Peak || Spacewatch || — || align=right | 3.0 km || 
|-id=860 bgcolor=#d6d6d6
| 475860 ||  || — || January 29, 2007 || Kitt Peak || Spacewatch || VER || align=right | 2.7 km || 
|-id=861 bgcolor=#d6d6d6
| 475861 ||  || — || December 21, 2006 || Mount Lemmon || Mount Lemmon Survey || — || align=right | 2.8 km || 
|-id=862 bgcolor=#fefefe
| 475862 ||  || — || January 17, 2007 || Kitt Peak || Spacewatch || — || align=right data-sort-value="0.54" | 540 m || 
|-id=863 bgcolor=#d6d6d6
| 475863 ||  || — || December 24, 2006 || Mount Lemmon || Mount Lemmon Survey || — || align=right | 3.6 km || 
|-id=864 bgcolor=#fefefe
| 475864 ||  || — || February 6, 2007 || Kitt Peak || Spacewatch || NYS || align=right data-sort-value="0.52" | 520 m || 
|-id=865 bgcolor=#d6d6d6
| 475865 ||  || — || February 6, 2007 || Kitt Peak || Spacewatch || — || align=right | 2.9 km || 
|-id=866 bgcolor=#fefefe
| 475866 ||  || — || January 17, 2007 || Kitt Peak || Spacewatch || — || align=right data-sort-value="0.71" | 710 m || 
|-id=867 bgcolor=#fefefe
| 475867 ||  || — || January 17, 2007 || Kitt Peak || Spacewatch || V || align=right data-sort-value="0.69" | 690 m || 
|-id=868 bgcolor=#fefefe
| 475868 ||  || — || February 6, 2007 || Palomar || NEAT || H || align=right data-sort-value="0.93" | 930 m || 
|-id=869 bgcolor=#fefefe
| 475869 ||  || — || February 6, 2007 || Palomar || NEAT || — || align=right data-sort-value="0.76" | 760 m || 
|-id=870 bgcolor=#fefefe
| 475870 ||  || — || November 21, 2006 || Mount Lemmon || Mount Lemmon Survey || — || align=right data-sort-value="0.68" | 680 m || 
|-id=871 bgcolor=#fefefe
| 475871 ||  || — || January 27, 2007 || Kitt Peak || Spacewatch || — || align=right data-sort-value="0.84" | 840 m || 
|-id=872 bgcolor=#fefefe
| 475872 ||  || — || February 6, 2007 || Mount Lemmon || Mount Lemmon Survey || — || align=right data-sort-value="0.60" | 600 m || 
|-id=873 bgcolor=#d6d6d6
| 475873 ||  || — || February 6, 2007 || Mount Lemmon || Mount Lemmon Survey || — || align=right | 3.4 km || 
|-id=874 bgcolor=#d6d6d6
| 475874 ||  || — || January 17, 2007 || Kitt Peak || Spacewatch || — || align=right | 2.8 km || 
|-id=875 bgcolor=#fefefe
| 475875 ||  || — || February 6, 2007 || Mount Lemmon || Mount Lemmon Survey || — || align=right data-sort-value="0.71" | 710 m || 
|-id=876 bgcolor=#d6d6d6
| 475876 ||  || — || January 26, 2007 || Kitt Peak || Spacewatch || — || align=right | 2.2 km || 
|-id=877 bgcolor=#fefefe
| 475877 ||  || — || January 27, 2007 || Mount Lemmon || Mount Lemmon Survey || — || align=right data-sort-value="0.55" | 550 m || 
|-id=878 bgcolor=#d6d6d6
| 475878 ||  || — || February 8, 2007 || Palomar || NEAT || — || align=right | 2.6 km || 
|-id=879 bgcolor=#fefefe
| 475879 ||  || — || February 8, 2007 || Palomar || NEAT || V || align=right data-sort-value="0.75" | 750 m || 
|-id=880 bgcolor=#d6d6d6
| 475880 ||  || — || February 10, 2007 || Mount Lemmon || Mount Lemmon Survey || VER || align=right | 2.8 km || 
|-id=881 bgcolor=#d6d6d6
| 475881 ||  || — || October 23, 2006 || Kitt Peak || Spacewatch || — || align=right | 2.8 km || 
|-id=882 bgcolor=#d6d6d6
| 475882 ||  || — || February 9, 2007 || Catalina || CSS || — || align=right | 2.7 km || 
|-id=883 bgcolor=#d6d6d6
| 475883 ||  || — || January 17, 2007 || Catalina || CSS || — || align=right | 3.4 km || 
|-id=884 bgcolor=#fefefe
| 475884 ||  || — || February 10, 2007 || Catalina || CSS || H || align=right | 1.0 km || 
|-id=885 bgcolor=#d6d6d6
| 475885 ||  || — || January 23, 2007 || Anderson Mesa || LONEOS || — || align=right | 3.4 km || 
|-id=886 bgcolor=#d6d6d6
| 475886 ||  || — || February 15, 2007 || Catalina || CSS || — || align=right | 3.0 km || 
|-id=887 bgcolor=#fefefe
| 475887 ||  || — || February 9, 2007 || Kitt Peak || Spacewatch || — || align=right data-sort-value="0.67" | 670 m || 
|-id=888 bgcolor=#d6d6d6
| 475888 ||  || — || February 16, 2007 || Catalina || CSS || — || align=right | 2.4 km || 
|-id=889 bgcolor=#d6d6d6
| 475889 ||  || — || February 16, 2007 || Črni Vrh || Črni Vrh || — || align=right | 2.6 km || 
|-id=890 bgcolor=#d6d6d6
| 475890 ||  || — || February 17, 2007 || Kitt Peak || Spacewatch || — || align=right | 2.6 km || 
|-id=891 bgcolor=#fefefe
| 475891 ||  || — || February 17, 2007 || Kitt Peak || Spacewatch || — || align=right data-sort-value="0.86" | 860 m || 
|-id=892 bgcolor=#d6d6d6
| 475892 ||  || — || September 10, 2004 || Kitt Peak || Spacewatch || — || align=right | 2.9 km || 
|-id=893 bgcolor=#fefefe
| 475893 ||  || — || February 17, 2007 || Kitt Peak || Spacewatch || — || align=right data-sort-value="0.69" | 690 m || 
|-id=894 bgcolor=#fefefe
| 475894 ||  || — || February 17, 2007 || Kitt Peak || Spacewatch || — || align=right data-sort-value="0.70" | 700 m || 
|-id=895 bgcolor=#d6d6d6
| 475895 ||  || — || November 21, 2006 || Mount Lemmon || Mount Lemmon Survey || URS || align=right | 3.4 km || 
|-id=896 bgcolor=#d6d6d6
| 475896 ||  || — || January 28, 2007 || Mount Lemmon || Mount Lemmon Survey || — || align=right | 2.4 km || 
|-id=897 bgcolor=#d6d6d6
| 475897 ||  || — || January 27, 2007 || Kitt Peak || Spacewatch || — || align=right | 2.4 km || 
|-id=898 bgcolor=#fefefe
| 475898 ||  || — || December 24, 2006 || Catalina || CSS || — || align=right | 1.1 km || 
|-id=899 bgcolor=#fefefe
| 475899 ||  || — || January 17, 2007 || Kitt Peak || Spacewatch || NYS || align=right data-sort-value="0.71" | 710 m || 
|-id=900 bgcolor=#d6d6d6
| 475900 ||  || — || December 21, 2006 || Mount Lemmon || Mount Lemmon Survey || — || align=right | 3.0 km || 
|}

475901–476000 

|-bgcolor=#d6d6d6
| 475901 ||  || — || February 9, 2007 || Kitt Peak || Spacewatch || — || align=right | 2.3 km || 
|-id=902 bgcolor=#d6d6d6
| 475902 ||  || — || January 27, 2007 || Mount Lemmon || Mount Lemmon Survey || — || align=right | 3.2 km || 
|-id=903 bgcolor=#fefefe
| 475903 ||  || — || January 29, 2007 || Kitt Peak || Spacewatch || H || align=right data-sort-value="0.58" | 580 m || 
|-id=904 bgcolor=#fefefe
| 475904 ||  || — || February 21, 2007 || Kitt Peak || Spacewatch || NYS || align=right data-sort-value="0.52" | 520 m || 
|-id=905 bgcolor=#fefefe
| 475905 ||  || — || February 22, 2007 || Kitt Peak || Spacewatch || NYS || align=right data-sort-value="0.72" | 720 m || 
|-id=906 bgcolor=#fefefe
| 475906 ||  || — || February 23, 2007 || Mount Lemmon || Mount Lemmon Survey || — || align=right data-sort-value="0.54" | 540 m || 
|-id=907 bgcolor=#fefefe
| 475907 ||  || — || January 28, 2007 || Mount Lemmon || Mount Lemmon Survey || — || align=right data-sort-value="0.90" | 900 m || 
|-id=908 bgcolor=#d6d6d6
| 475908 ||  || — || February 23, 2007 || Kitt Peak || Spacewatch || — || align=right | 2.1 km || 
|-id=909 bgcolor=#d6d6d6
| 475909 ||  || — || October 6, 2005 || Kitt Peak || Spacewatch || — || align=right | 2.0 km || 
|-id=910 bgcolor=#fefefe
| 475910 ||  || — || February 23, 2007 || Kitt Peak || Spacewatch || H || align=right data-sort-value="0.49" | 490 m || 
|-id=911 bgcolor=#d6d6d6
| 475911 ||  || — || February 23, 2007 || Kitt Peak || Spacewatch || — || align=right | 3.6 km || 
|-id=912 bgcolor=#fefefe
| 475912 ||  || — || February 23, 2007 || Kitt Peak || Spacewatch || — || align=right data-sort-value="0.81" | 810 m || 
|-id=913 bgcolor=#fefefe
| 475913 ||  || — || February 27, 2007 || Catalina || CSS || — || align=right | 2.2 km || 
|-id=914 bgcolor=#d6d6d6
| 475914 ||  || — || February 21, 2007 || Kitt Peak || Spacewatch || 7:4 || align=right | 4.1 km || 
|-id=915 bgcolor=#fefefe
| 475915 ||  || — || February 16, 2007 || Catalina || CSS || — || align=right data-sort-value="0.91" | 910 m || 
|-id=916 bgcolor=#d6d6d6
| 475916 ||  || — || February 26, 2007 || Mount Lemmon || Mount Lemmon Survey || — || align=right | 5.0 km || 
|-id=917 bgcolor=#d6d6d6
| 475917 ||  || — || January 27, 2007 || Kitt Peak || Spacewatch || — || align=right | 2.7 km || 
|-id=918 bgcolor=#d6d6d6
| 475918 ||  || — || January 27, 2007 || Mount Lemmon || Mount Lemmon Survey || — || align=right | 2.8 km || 
|-id=919 bgcolor=#fefefe
| 475919 ||  || — || January 28, 2007 || Mount Lemmon || Mount Lemmon Survey || — || align=right data-sort-value="0.66" | 660 m || 
|-id=920 bgcolor=#fefefe
| 475920 ||  || — || January 27, 2007 || Mount Lemmon || Mount Lemmon Survey || — || align=right data-sort-value="0.97" | 970 m || 
|-id=921 bgcolor=#fefefe
| 475921 ||  || — || March 9, 2007 || Kitt Peak || Spacewatch || — || align=right data-sort-value="0.80" | 800 m || 
|-id=922 bgcolor=#fefefe
| 475922 ||  || — || February 27, 2007 || Kitt Peak || Spacewatch || — || align=right data-sort-value="0.78" | 780 m || 
|-id=923 bgcolor=#fefefe
| 475923 ||  || — || March 9, 2007 || Kitt Peak || Spacewatch || — || align=right data-sort-value="0.63" | 630 m || 
|-id=924 bgcolor=#fefefe
| 475924 ||  || — || March 9, 2007 || Kitt Peak || Spacewatch || — || align=right data-sort-value="0.67" | 670 m || 
|-id=925 bgcolor=#fefefe
| 475925 ||  || — || March 9, 2007 || Mount Lemmon || Mount Lemmon Survey || — || align=right data-sort-value="0.71" | 710 m || 
|-id=926 bgcolor=#d6d6d6
| 475926 ||  || — || March 10, 2007 || Mount Lemmon || Mount Lemmon Survey || — || align=right | 3.0 km || 
|-id=927 bgcolor=#fefefe
| 475927 ||  || — || March 10, 2007 || Palomar || NEAT || — || align=right | 1.0 km || 
|-id=928 bgcolor=#fefefe
| 475928 ||  || — || March 10, 2007 || Kitt Peak || Spacewatch || — || align=right | 1.4 km || 
|-id=929 bgcolor=#d6d6d6
| 475929 ||  || — || March 10, 2007 || Palomar || NEAT || — || align=right | 2.8 km || 
|-id=930 bgcolor=#fefefe
| 475930 ||  || — || March 10, 2007 || Kitt Peak || Spacewatch || — || align=right data-sort-value="0.64" | 640 m || 
|-id=931 bgcolor=#d6d6d6
| 475931 ||  || — || March 11, 2007 || Kitt Peak || Spacewatch || — || align=right | 2.7 km || 
|-id=932 bgcolor=#fefefe
| 475932 ||  || — || March 11, 2007 || XuYi || PMO NEO || H || align=right data-sort-value="0.75" | 750 m || 
|-id=933 bgcolor=#fefefe
| 475933 ||  || — || March 10, 2007 || Kitt Peak || Spacewatch || — || align=right data-sort-value="0.70" | 700 m || 
|-id=934 bgcolor=#d6d6d6
| 475934 ||  || — || February 22, 2007 || Kitt Peak || Spacewatch || — || align=right | 2.7 km || 
|-id=935 bgcolor=#d6d6d6
| 475935 ||  || — || March 11, 2007 || Kitt Peak || Spacewatch || — || align=right | 2.7 km || 
|-id=936 bgcolor=#fefefe
| 475936 ||  || — || March 13, 2007 || Mount Lemmon || Mount Lemmon Survey || H || align=right data-sort-value="0.75" | 750 m || 
|-id=937 bgcolor=#FA8072
| 475937 ||  || — || February 23, 2007 || Socorro || LINEAR || — || align=right data-sort-value="0.65" | 650 m || 
|-id=938 bgcolor=#fefefe
| 475938 ||  || — || March 9, 2007 || Mount Lemmon || Mount Lemmon Survey || — || align=right data-sort-value="0.85" | 850 m || 
|-id=939 bgcolor=#fefefe
| 475939 ||  || — || March 9, 2007 || Mount Lemmon || Mount Lemmon Survey || — || align=right data-sort-value="0.79" | 790 m || 
|-id=940 bgcolor=#fefefe
| 475940 ||  || — || March 12, 2007 || Kitt Peak || Spacewatch || — || align=right data-sort-value="0.76" | 760 m || 
|-id=941 bgcolor=#fefefe
| 475941 ||  || — || March 15, 2007 || Mount Lemmon || Mount Lemmon Survey || V || align=right data-sort-value="0.59" | 590 m || 
|-id=942 bgcolor=#fefefe
| 475942 ||  || — || February 8, 2007 || Kitt Peak || Spacewatch || H || align=right data-sort-value="0.49" | 490 m || 
|-id=943 bgcolor=#d6d6d6
| 475943 ||  || — || March 14, 2007 || Kitt Peak || Spacewatch || — || align=right | 2.8 km || 
|-id=944 bgcolor=#fefefe
| 475944 ||  || — || March 14, 2007 || Kitt Peak || Spacewatch || NYS || align=right data-sort-value="0.54" | 540 m || 
|-id=945 bgcolor=#fefefe
| 475945 ||  || — || March 13, 2007 || Mount Lemmon || Mount Lemmon Survey || — || align=right data-sort-value="0.76" | 760 m || 
|-id=946 bgcolor=#fefefe
| 475946 ||  || — || March 14, 2007 || Kitt Peak || Spacewatch || NYS || align=right data-sort-value="0.76" | 760 m || 
|-id=947 bgcolor=#d6d6d6
| 475947 ||  || — || March 11, 2007 || Kitt Peak || Spacewatch || — || align=right | 3.1 km || 
|-id=948 bgcolor=#d6d6d6
| 475948 ||  || — || March 10, 2007 || Mount Lemmon || Mount Lemmon Survey || — || align=right | 3.2 km || 
|-id=949 bgcolor=#E9E9E9
| 475949 ||  || — || March 13, 2007 || Mount Lemmon || Mount Lemmon Survey || — || align=right data-sort-value="0.75" | 750 m || 
|-id=950 bgcolor=#FFC2E0
| 475950 ||  || — || March 17, 2007 || Catalina || CSS || APOcritical || align=right data-sort-value="0.39" | 390 m || 
|-id=951 bgcolor=#d6d6d6
| 475951 ||  || — || March 20, 2007 || Kitt Peak || Spacewatch || — || align=right | 3.2 km || 
|-id=952 bgcolor=#fefefe
| 475952 ||  || — || March 23, 2007 || Siding Spring || SSS || — || align=right | 1.1 km || 
|-id=953 bgcolor=#E9E9E9
| 475953 ||  || — || April 11, 2007 || Catalina || CSS || — || align=right | 1.6 km || 
|-id=954 bgcolor=#d6d6d6
| 475954 ||  || — || March 14, 2007 || Kitt Peak || Spacewatch || — || align=right | 2.9 km || 
|-id=955 bgcolor=#E9E9E9
| 475955 ||  || — || April 11, 2007 || Kitt Peak || Spacewatch || BRG || align=right | 1.1 km || 
|-id=956 bgcolor=#fefefe
| 475956 ||  || — || April 11, 2007 || Kitt Peak || Spacewatch || H || align=right data-sort-value="0.70" | 700 m || 
|-id=957 bgcolor=#fefefe
| 475957 ||  || — || March 13, 2007 || Kitt Peak || Spacewatch || V || align=right data-sort-value="0.56" | 560 m || 
|-id=958 bgcolor=#fefefe
| 475958 ||  || — || April 15, 2007 || Kitt Peak || Spacewatch || NYS || align=right data-sort-value="0.65" | 650 m || 
|-id=959 bgcolor=#fefefe
| 475959 ||  || — || March 13, 2007 || Kitt Peak || Spacewatch || — || align=right data-sort-value="0.97" | 970 m || 
|-id=960 bgcolor=#E9E9E9
| 475960 ||  || — || March 16, 2007 || Mount Lemmon || Mount Lemmon Survey || — || align=right | 2.5 km || 
|-id=961 bgcolor=#fefefe
| 475961 ||  || — || February 25, 2007 || Mount Lemmon || Mount Lemmon Survey || — || align=right data-sort-value="0.80" | 800 m || 
|-id=962 bgcolor=#E9E9E9
| 475962 ||  || — || April 18, 2007 || Mount Lemmon || Mount Lemmon Survey || — || align=right data-sort-value="0.73" | 730 m || 
|-id=963 bgcolor=#d6d6d6
| 475963 ||  || — || March 15, 2007 || Mount Lemmon || Mount Lemmon Survey || 7:4 || align=right | 4.0 km || 
|-id=964 bgcolor=#E9E9E9
| 475964 ||  || — || April 20, 2007 || Kitt Peak || Spacewatch || — || align=right data-sort-value="0.86" | 860 m || 
|-id=965 bgcolor=#E9E9E9
| 475965 ||  || — || December 24, 2005 || Kitt Peak || Spacewatch || — || align=right data-sort-value="0.82" | 820 m || 
|-id=966 bgcolor=#E9E9E9
| 475966 ||  || — || April 24, 2007 || Mount Lemmon || Mount Lemmon Survey || — || align=right | 1.1 km || 
|-id=967 bgcolor=#FFC2E0
| 475967 ||  || — || January 8, 2007 || Socorro || LINEAR || AMO +1km || align=right | 2.0 km || 
|-id=968 bgcolor=#E9E9E9
| 475968 ||  || — || May 10, 2007 || Kitt Peak || Spacewatch || — || align=right | 1.4 km || 
|-id=969 bgcolor=#E9E9E9
| 475969 ||  || — || April 22, 2007 || Mount Lemmon || Mount Lemmon Survey || — || align=right data-sort-value="0.98" | 980 m || 
|-id=970 bgcolor=#E9E9E9
| 475970 ||  || — || May 15, 2007 || Tiki || S. F. Hönig, N. Teamo || — || align=right data-sort-value="0.95" | 950 m || 
|-id=971 bgcolor=#E9E9E9
| 475971 ||  || — || May 16, 2007 || Kitt Peak || Spacewatch || — || align=right | 1.0 km || 
|-id=972 bgcolor=#E9E9E9
| 475972 ||  || — || April 19, 2007 || Mount Lemmon || Mount Lemmon Survey || — || align=right data-sort-value="0.83" | 830 m || 
|-id=973 bgcolor=#E9E9E9
| 475973 ||  || — || April 25, 2007 || Mount Lemmon || Mount Lemmon Survey || — || align=right | 1.0 km || 
|-id=974 bgcolor=#E9E9E9
| 475974 ||  || — || June 24, 2007 || Kitt Peak || Spacewatch || — || align=right | 1.5 km || 
|-id=975 bgcolor=#E9E9E9
| 475975 ||  || — || July 14, 2007 || Dauban || Chante-Perdrix Obs. || — || align=right | 2.0 km || 
|-id=976 bgcolor=#E9E9E9
| 475976 ||  || — || July 10, 2007 || Siding Spring || SSS || — || align=right | 1.8 km || 
|-id=977 bgcolor=#E9E9E9
| 475977 ||  || — || June 15, 2007 || Kitt Peak || Spacewatch || — || align=right | 1.7 km || 
|-id=978 bgcolor=#E9E9E9
| 475978 ||  || — || July 19, 2007 || Mount Lemmon || Mount Lemmon Survey || — || align=right | 1.9 km || 
|-id=979 bgcolor=#FA8072
| 475979 ||  || — || July 16, 2007 || Siding Spring || SSS || fast? || align=right | 1.5 km || 
|-id=980 bgcolor=#E9E9E9
| 475980 ||  || — || August 8, 2007 || Socorro || LINEAR || — || align=right | 1.6 km || 
|-id=981 bgcolor=#FA8072
| 475981 ||  || — || August 9, 2007 || Socorro || LINEAR || — || align=right | 1.4 km || 
|-id=982 bgcolor=#E9E9E9
| 475982 ||  || — || August 9, 2007 || Socorro || LINEAR || — || align=right | 1.6 km || 
|-id=983 bgcolor=#E9E9E9
| 475983 ||  || — || August 9, 2007 || Socorro || LINEAR || EUN || align=right | 1.6 km || 
|-id=984 bgcolor=#E9E9E9
| 475984 ||  || — || August 12, 2007 || Socorro || LINEAR || JUN || align=right | 1.2 km || 
|-id=985 bgcolor=#E9E9E9
| 475985 ||  || — || August 14, 2007 || Pla D'Arguines || R. Ferrando || WIT || align=right data-sort-value="0.85" | 850 m || 
|-id=986 bgcolor=#E9E9E9
| 475986 ||  || — || August 10, 2007 || Kitt Peak || Spacewatch || — || align=right | 1.7 km || 
|-id=987 bgcolor=#FA8072
| 475987 ||  || — || August 12, 2007 || XuYi || PMO NEO || — || align=right | 1.8 km || 
|-id=988 bgcolor=#E9E9E9
| 475988 ||  || — || August 13, 2007 || Socorro || LINEAR || — || align=right | 1.7 km || 
|-id=989 bgcolor=#E9E9E9
| 475989 ||  || — || August 9, 2007 || Kitt Peak || Spacewatch || EUNfast? || align=right | 1.2 km || 
|-id=990 bgcolor=#E9E9E9
| 475990 ||  || — || August 9, 2007 || Socorro || LINEAR || — || align=right | 1.5 km || 
|-id=991 bgcolor=#E9E9E9
| 475991 ||  || — || August 10, 2007 || Kitt Peak || Spacewatch || — || align=right | 1.2 km || 
|-id=992 bgcolor=#E9E9E9
| 475992 ||  || — || August 22, 2007 || Anderson Mesa || LONEOS || — || align=right | 2.2 km || 
|-id=993 bgcolor=#E9E9E9
| 475993 ||  || — || September 1, 2007 || Siding Spring || K. Sárneczky, L. Kiss || — || align=right | 3.1 km || 
|-id=994 bgcolor=#E9E9E9
| 475994 ||  || — || September 3, 2007 || Mount Lemmon || Mount Lemmon Survey || — || align=right | 1.6 km || 
|-id=995 bgcolor=#E9E9E9
| 475995 ||  || — || September 8, 2007 || Eskridge || G. Hug || AEO || align=right | 1.1 km || 
|-id=996 bgcolor=#E9E9E9
| 475996 ||  || — || September 3, 2007 || Catalina || CSS || — || align=right | 1.4 km || 
|-id=997 bgcolor=#E9E9E9
| 475997 ||  || — || September 4, 2007 || Mount Lemmon || Mount Lemmon Survey || — || align=right data-sort-value="0.81" | 810 m || 
|-id=998 bgcolor=#E9E9E9
| 475998 ||  || — || September 6, 2007 || Anderson Mesa || LONEOS || — || align=right | 1.9 km || 
|-id=999 bgcolor=#E9E9E9
| 475999 ||  || — || September 9, 2007 || Kitt Peak || Spacewatch || — || align=right | 2.7 km || 
|-id=000 bgcolor=#E9E9E9
| 476000 ||  || — || September 9, 2007 || Mount Lemmon || Mount Lemmon Survey || — || align=right | 1.3 km || 
|}

References

External links 
 Discovery Circumstances: Numbered Minor Planets (475001)–(480000) (IAU Minor Planet Center)

0475